

261001–261100 

|-bgcolor=#d6d6d6
| 261001 ||  || — || September 25, 2005 || Kitt Peak || Spacewatch || — || align=right | 3.0 km || 
|-id=002 bgcolor=#E9E9E9
| 261002 ||  || — || September 25, 2005 || Kitt Peak || Spacewatch || AST || align=right | 1.8 km || 
|-id=003 bgcolor=#E9E9E9
| 261003 ||  || — || September 25, 2005 || Kitt Peak || Spacewatch || — || align=right | 3.5 km || 
|-id=004 bgcolor=#E9E9E9
| 261004 ||  || — || September 25, 2005 || Palomar || NEAT || DOR || align=right | 2.7 km || 
|-id=005 bgcolor=#d6d6d6
| 261005 ||  || — || September 25, 2005 || Kitt Peak || Spacewatch || EOS || align=right | 2.0 km || 
|-id=006 bgcolor=#d6d6d6
| 261006 ||  || — || September 25, 2005 || Kitt Peak || Spacewatch || BRA || align=right | 1.7 km || 
|-id=007 bgcolor=#E9E9E9
| 261007 ||  || — || September 25, 2005 || Kitt Peak || Spacewatch || GEF || align=right | 1.7 km || 
|-id=008 bgcolor=#E9E9E9
| 261008 ||  || — || September 25, 2005 || Kitt Peak || Spacewatch || — || align=right | 2.4 km || 
|-id=009 bgcolor=#E9E9E9
| 261009 ||  || — || September 25, 2005 || Kitt Peak || Spacewatch || — || align=right | 3.3 km || 
|-id=010 bgcolor=#d6d6d6
| 261010 ||  || — || September 25, 2005 || Palomar || NEAT || EOS || align=right | 3.0 km || 
|-id=011 bgcolor=#d6d6d6
| 261011 ||  || — || September 25, 2005 || Kitt Peak || Spacewatch || — || align=right | 3.9 km || 
|-id=012 bgcolor=#E9E9E9
| 261012 ||  || — || September 26, 2005 || Catalina || CSS || — || align=right | 4.2 km || 
|-id=013 bgcolor=#d6d6d6
| 261013 ||  || — || September 26, 2005 || Kitt Peak || Spacewatch || EOS || align=right | 2.1 km || 
|-id=014 bgcolor=#d6d6d6
| 261014 ||  || — || September 26, 2005 || Kitt Peak || Spacewatch || KOR || align=right | 1.5 km || 
|-id=015 bgcolor=#E9E9E9
| 261015 ||  || — || September 26, 2005 || Kitt Peak || Spacewatch || — || align=right | 2.8 km || 
|-id=016 bgcolor=#d6d6d6
| 261016 ||  || — || September 26, 2005 || Kitt Peak || Spacewatch || — || align=right | 2.3 km || 
|-id=017 bgcolor=#E9E9E9
| 261017 ||  || — || September 26, 2005 || Palomar || NEAT || — || align=right | 2.8 km || 
|-id=018 bgcolor=#d6d6d6
| 261018 ||  || — || September 28, 2005 || Palomar || NEAT || EOS || align=right | 2.8 km || 
|-id=019 bgcolor=#E9E9E9
| 261019 ||  || — || September 29, 2005 || Kitt Peak || Spacewatch || — || align=right | 2.1 km || 
|-id=020 bgcolor=#E9E9E9
| 261020 ||  || — || September 29, 2005 || Kitt Peak || Spacewatch || — || align=right | 1.9 km || 
|-id=021 bgcolor=#d6d6d6
| 261021 ||  || — || September 29, 2005 || Kitt Peak || Spacewatch || VER || align=right | 4.4 km || 
|-id=022 bgcolor=#E9E9E9
| 261022 ||  || — || September 29, 2005 || Anderson Mesa || LONEOS || HOF || align=right | 4.0 km || 
|-id=023 bgcolor=#d6d6d6
| 261023 ||  || — || September 29, 2005 || Mount Lemmon || Mount Lemmon Survey || K-2 || align=right | 1.4 km || 
|-id=024 bgcolor=#d6d6d6
| 261024 ||  || — || September 29, 2005 || Mount Lemmon || Mount Lemmon Survey || — || align=right | 4.4 km || 
|-id=025 bgcolor=#E9E9E9
| 261025 ||  || — || September 29, 2005 || Mount Lemmon || Mount Lemmon Survey || WIT || align=right | 1.1 km || 
|-id=026 bgcolor=#d6d6d6
| 261026 ||  || — || September 29, 2005 || Mount Lemmon || Mount Lemmon Survey || — || align=right | 3.3 km || 
|-id=027 bgcolor=#E9E9E9
| 261027 ||  || — || September 29, 2005 || Anderson Mesa || LONEOS || — || align=right | 4.1 km || 
|-id=028 bgcolor=#E9E9E9
| 261028 ||  || — || September 29, 2005 || Mount Lemmon || Mount Lemmon Survey || HOF || align=right | 2.8 km || 
|-id=029 bgcolor=#E9E9E9
| 261029 ||  || — || September 29, 2005 || Kitt Peak || Spacewatch || — || align=right | 3.3 km || 
|-id=030 bgcolor=#E9E9E9
| 261030 ||  || — || September 24, 2005 || Kitt Peak || Spacewatch || — || align=right | 2.2 km || 
|-id=031 bgcolor=#E9E9E9
| 261031 ||  || — || September 25, 2005 || Palomar || NEAT || MAR || align=right | 1.3 km || 
|-id=032 bgcolor=#d6d6d6
| 261032 ||  || — || September 25, 2005 || Kitt Peak || Spacewatch || EOS || align=right | 2.0 km || 
|-id=033 bgcolor=#E9E9E9
| 261033 ||  || — || September 25, 2005 || Kitt Peak || Spacewatch || — || align=right | 1.2 km || 
|-id=034 bgcolor=#d6d6d6
| 261034 ||  || — || September 25, 2005 || Kitt Peak || Spacewatch || — || align=right | 2.4 km || 
|-id=035 bgcolor=#E9E9E9
| 261035 ||  || — || September 25, 2005 || Kitt Peak || Spacewatch || PAD || align=right | 1.6 km || 
|-id=036 bgcolor=#d6d6d6
| 261036 ||  || — || September 25, 2005 || Kitt Peak || Spacewatch || VER || align=right | 3.8 km || 
|-id=037 bgcolor=#d6d6d6
| 261037 ||  || — || September 25, 2005 || Kitt Peak || Spacewatch || — || align=right | 3.5 km || 
|-id=038 bgcolor=#d6d6d6
| 261038 ||  || — || September 25, 2005 || Kitt Peak || Spacewatch || — || align=right | 3.3 km || 
|-id=039 bgcolor=#d6d6d6
| 261039 ||  || — || September 25, 2005 || Kitt Peak || Spacewatch || THM || align=right | 2.5 km || 
|-id=040 bgcolor=#E9E9E9
| 261040 ||  || — || September 25, 2005 || Kitt Peak || Spacewatch || — || align=right | 1.5 km || 
|-id=041 bgcolor=#d6d6d6
| 261041 ||  || — || September 25, 2005 || Kitt Peak || Spacewatch || — || align=right | 3.2 km || 
|-id=042 bgcolor=#d6d6d6
| 261042 ||  || — || September 25, 2005 || Kitt Peak || Spacewatch || — || align=right | 2.9 km || 
|-id=043 bgcolor=#E9E9E9
| 261043 ||  || — || September 25, 2005 || Kitt Peak || Spacewatch || AST || align=right | 1.9 km || 
|-id=044 bgcolor=#d6d6d6
| 261044 ||  || — || September 26, 2005 || Kitt Peak || Spacewatch || — || align=right | 3.8 km || 
|-id=045 bgcolor=#E9E9E9
| 261045 ||  || — || September 26, 2005 || Kitt Peak || Spacewatch || — || align=right | 2.5 km || 
|-id=046 bgcolor=#d6d6d6
| 261046 ||  || — || September 26, 2005 || Kitt Peak || Spacewatch || — || align=right | 4.7 km || 
|-id=047 bgcolor=#E9E9E9
| 261047 ||  || — || September 26, 2005 || Kitt Peak || Spacewatch || WIT || align=right | 1.1 km || 
|-id=048 bgcolor=#d6d6d6
| 261048 ||  || — || September 26, 2005 || Kitt Peak || Spacewatch || — || align=right | 2.6 km || 
|-id=049 bgcolor=#d6d6d6
| 261049 ||  || — || September 28, 2005 || Palomar || NEAT || EOS || align=right | 3.0 km || 
|-id=050 bgcolor=#d6d6d6
| 261050 ||  || — || September 29, 2005 || Kitt Peak || Spacewatch || — || align=right | 4.0 km || 
|-id=051 bgcolor=#E9E9E9
| 261051 ||  || — || September 29, 2005 || Kitt Peak || Spacewatch || NEM || align=right | 2.8 km || 
|-id=052 bgcolor=#E9E9E9
| 261052 ||  || — || September 29, 2005 || Anderson Mesa || LONEOS || — || align=right | 2.3 km || 
|-id=053 bgcolor=#d6d6d6
| 261053 ||  || — || September 29, 2005 || Kitt Peak || Spacewatch || VER || align=right | 4.5 km || 
|-id=054 bgcolor=#d6d6d6
| 261054 ||  || — || September 29, 2005 || Kitt Peak || Spacewatch || — || align=right | 3.9 km || 
|-id=055 bgcolor=#E9E9E9
| 261055 ||  || — || September 29, 2005 || Anderson Mesa || LONEOS || — || align=right | 3.3 km || 
|-id=056 bgcolor=#d6d6d6
| 261056 ||  || — || September 29, 2005 || Mount Lemmon || Mount Lemmon Survey || — || align=right | 4.2 km || 
|-id=057 bgcolor=#E9E9E9
| 261057 ||  || — || September 29, 2005 || Mount Lemmon || Mount Lemmon Survey || — || align=right | 2.8 km || 
|-id=058 bgcolor=#d6d6d6
| 261058 ||  || — || September 29, 2005 || Kitt Peak || Spacewatch || — || align=right | 3.9 km || 
|-id=059 bgcolor=#E9E9E9
| 261059 ||  || — || September 29, 2005 || Kitt Peak || Spacewatch || AGN || align=right | 1.4 km || 
|-id=060 bgcolor=#d6d6d6
| 261060 ||  || — || September 29, 2005 || Mount Lemmon || Mount Lemmon Survey || — || align=right | 3.4 km || 
|-id=061 bgcolor=#d6d6d6
| 261061 ||  || — || September 29, 2005 || Palomar || NEAT || — || align=right | 4.6 km || 
|-id=062 bgcolor=#d6d6d6
| 261062 ||  || — || September 29, 2005 || Mount Lemmon || Mount Lemmon Survey || — || align=right | 3.1 km || 
|-id=063 bgcolor=#E9E9E9
| 261063 ||  || — || September 29, 2005 || Anderson Mesa || LONEOS || — || align=right | 3.5 km || 
|-id=064 bgcolor=#E9E9E9
| 261064 ||  || — || September 29, 2005 || Mount Lemmon || Mount Lemmon Survey || — || align=right | 1.7 km || 
|-id=065 bgcolor=#E9E9E9
| 261065 ||  || — || September 29, 2005 || Anderson Mesa || LONEOS || — || align=right | 3.2 km || 
|-id=066 bgcolor=#d6d6d6
| 261066 ||  || — || September 29, 2005 || Palomar || NEAT || HYG || align=right | 4.1 km || 
|-id=067 bgcolor=#d6d6d6
| 261067 ||  || — || September 30, 2005 || Kitt Peak || Spacewatch || — || align=right | 3.0 km || 
|-id=068 bgcolor=#FA8072
| 261068 ||  || — || September 30, 2005 || Kitt Peak || Spacewatch || — || align=right | 1.2 km || 
|-id=069 bgcolor=#E9E9E9
| 261069 ||  || — || September 30, 2005 || Palomar || NEAT || — || align=right | 2.1 km || 
|-id=070 bgcolor=#d6d6d6
| 261070 ||  || — || September 30, 2005 || Anderson Mesa || LONEOS || EOS || align=right | 4.6 km || 
|-id=071 bgcolor=#E9E9E9
| 261071 ||  || — || September 30, 2005 || Mount Lemmon || Mount Lemmon Survey || — || align=right | 1.2 km || 
|-id=072 bgcolor=#E9E9E9
| 261072 ||  || — || September 30, 2005 || Catalina || CSS || — || align=right | 2.9 km || 
|-id=073 bgcolor=#d6d6d6
| 261073 ||  || — || September 30, 2005 || Kitt Peak || Spacewatch || VER || align=right | 3.9 km || 
|-id=074 bgcolor=#E9E9E9
| 261074 ||  || — || September 30, 2005 || Palomar || NEAT || HNS || align=right | 1.5 km || 
|-id=075 bgcolor=#E9E9E9
| 261075 ||  || — || September 30, 2005 || Mount Lemmon || Mount Lemmon Survey || — || align=right | 2.9 km || 
|-id=076 bgcolor=#E9E9E9
| 261076 ||  || — || September 30, 2005 || Anderson Mesa || LONEOS || — || align=right | 3.4 km || 
|-id=077 bgcolor=#d6d6d6
| 261077 ||  || — || September 30, 2005 || Catalina || CSS || — || align=right | 3.5 km || 
|-id=078 bgcolor=#d6d6d6
| 261078 ||  || — || September 30, 2005 || Mount Lemmon || Mount Lemmon Survey || THM || align=right | 2.6 km || 
|-id=079 bgcolor=#d6d6d6
| 261079 ||  || — || September 30, 2005 || Mount Lemmon || Mount Lemmon Survey || — || align=right | 4.6 km || 
|-id=080 bgcolor=#E9E9E9
| 261080 ||  || — || September 29, 2005 || Catalina || CSS || — || align=right | 2.3 km || 
|-id=081 bgcolor=#E9E9E9
| 261081 ||  || — || September 29, 2005 || Palomar || NEAT || — || align=right | 2.9 km || 
|-id=082 bgcolor=#d6d6d6
| 261082 ||  || — || September 30, 2005 || Kitt Peak || Spacewatch || THM || align=right | 2.6 km || 
|-id=083 bgcolor=#E9E9E9
| 261083 ||  || — || September 30, 2005 || Kitt Peak || Spacewatch || — || align=right | 1.8 km || 
|-id=084 bgcolor=#d6d6d6
| 261084 ||  || — || September 30, 2005 || Mount Lemmon || Mount Lemmon Survey || HYG || align=right | 3.3 km || 
|-id=085 bgcolor=#E9E9E9
| 261085 ||  || — || September 29, 2005 || Kitt Peak || Spacewatch || AGN || align=right | 1.0 km || 
|-id=086 bgcolor=#d6d6d6
| 261086 ||  || — || September 29, 2005 || Mount Lemmon || Mount Lemmon Survey || — || align=right | 2.7 km || 
|-id=087 bgcolor=#d6d6d6
| 261087 ||  || — || September 30, 2005 || Kitt Peak || Spacewatch || — || align=right | 4.4 km || 
|-id=088 bgcolor=#E9E9E9
| 261088 ||  || — || September 30, 2005 || Mount Lemmon || Mount Lemmon Survey || HEN || align=right | 1.1 km || 
|-id=089 bgcolor=#E9E9E9
| 261089 ||  || — || September 30, 2005 || Mount Lemmon || Mount Lemmon Survey || WIT || align=right | 1.2 km || 
|-id=090 bgcolor=#E9E9E9
| 261090 ||  || — || September 30, 2005 || Kitt Peak || Spacewatch || AGN || align=right | 1.5 km || 
|-id=091 bgcolor=#E9E9E9
| 261091 ||  || — || September 30, 2005 || Kitt Peak || Spacewatch || — || align=right | 2.8 km || 
|-id=092 bgcolor=#E9E9E9
| 261092 ||  || — || September 24, 2005 || Palomar || NEAT || — || align=right | 2.4 km || 
|-id=093 bgcolor=#d6d6d6
| 261093 ||  || — || September 24, 2005 || Palomar || NEAT || — || align=right | 3.6 km || 
|-id=094 bgcolor=#d6d6d6
| 261094 ||  || — || September 24, 2005 || Palomar || NEAT || — || align=right | 4.7 km || 
|-id=095 bgcolor=#fefefe
| 261095 ||  || — || September 22, 2005 || Palomar || NEAT || NYS || align=right | 1.00 km || 
|-id=096 bgcolor=#E9E9E9
| 261096 ||  || — || September 25, 2005 || Catalina || CSS || — || align=right | 3.3 km || 
|-id=097 bgcolor=#E9E9E9
| 261097 ||  || — || September 26, 2005 || Palomar || NEAT || MRX || align=right | 1.4 km || 
|-id=098 bgcolor=#d6d6d6
| 261098 ||  || — || September 23, 2005 || Catalina || CSS || — || align=right | 3.5 km || 
|-id=099 bgcolor=#E9E9E9
| 261099 ||  || — || September 23, 2005 || Catalina || CSS || — || align=right | 2.1 km || 
|-id=100 bgcolor=#d6d6d6
| 261100 ||  || — || September 30, 2005 || Kitt Peak || Spacewatch || EOS || align=right | 1.7 km || 
|}

261101–261200 

|-bgcolor=#d6d6d6
| 261101 ||  || — || September 26, 2005 || Palomar || NEAT || KOR || align=right | 1.6 km || 
|-id=102 bgcolor=#E9E9E9
| 261102 ||  || — || September 30, 2005 || Anderson Mesa || LONEOS || — || align=right | 2.3 km || 
|-id=103 bgcolor=#E9E9E9
| 261103 ||  || — || September 30, 2005 || Anderson Mesa || LONEOS || AGN || align=right | 1.5 km || 
|-id=104 bgcolor=#d6d6d6
| 261104 ||  || — || September 25, 2005 || Kitt Peak || Spacewatch || — || align=right | 3.0 km || 
|-id=105 bgcolor=#E9E9E9
| 261105 ||  || — || September 23, 2005 || Catalina || CSS || — || align=right | 1.9 km || 
|-id=106 bgcolor=#E9E9E9
| 261106 ||  || — || September 29, 2005 || Kitt Peak || Spacewatch || AGN || align=right | 1.5 km || 
|-id=107 bgcolor=#E9E9E9
| 261107 Cameroncasimir ||  ||  || September 21, 2005 || Apache Point || A. C. Becker || — || align=right | 2.3 km || 
|-id=108 bgcolor=#d6d6d6
| 261108 Obanhelian ||  ||  || September 24, 2005 || Apache Point || A. C. Becker || HYG || align=right | 2.7 km || 
|-id=109 bgcolor=#d6d6d6
| 261109 Annie ||  ||  || September 25, 2005 || Apache Point || A. C. Becker || VER || align=right | 4.1 km || 
|-id=110 bgcolor=#E9E9E9
| 261110 Neoma ||  ||  || September 25, 2005 || Apache Point || A. C. Becker || — || align=right | 2.7 km || 
|-id=111 bgcolor=#d6d6d6
| 261111 ||  || — || September 26, 2005 || Apache Point || A. C. Becker || — || align=right | 3.0 km || 
|-id=112 bgcolor=#E9E9E9
| 261112 ||  || — || September 23, 2005 || Kitt Peak || Spacewatch || WIT || align=right | 1.3 km || 
|-id=113 bgcolor=#E9E9E9
| 261113 ||  || — || September 29, 2005 || Kitt Peak || Spacewatch || HOF || align=right | 3.1 km || 
|-id=114 bgcolor=#E9E9E9
| 261114 ||  || — || October 1, 2005 || Catalina || CSS || HOF || align=right | 3.2 km || 
|-id=115 bgcolor=#d6d6d6
| 261115 ||  || — || October 1, 2005 || Anderson Mesa || LONEOS || HYG || align=right | 4.3 km || 
|-id=116 bgcolor=#E9E9E9
| 261116 ||  || — || October 1, 2005 || Catalina || CSS || RAF || align=right | 1.3 km || 
|-id=117 bgcolor=#E9E9E9
| 261117 ||  || — || October 1, 2005 || Catalina || CSS || — || align=right | 2.8 km || 
|-id=118 bgcolor=#d6d6d6
| 261118 ||  || — || October 2, 2005 || Palomar || NEAT || — || align=right | 5.8 km || 
|-id=119 bgcolor=#E9E9E9
| 261119 ||  || — || October 2, 2005 || Mount Lemmon || Mount Lemmon Survey || WIT || align=right | 1.3 km || 
|-id=120 bgcolor=#E9E9E9
| 261120 ||  || — || October 1, 2005 || Kitt Peak || Spacewatch || GEF || align=right | 1.5 km || 
|-id=121 bgcolor=#E9E9E9
| 261121 ||  || — || October 2, 2005 || Mount Lemmon || Mount Lemmon Survey || HOF || align=right | 2.8 km || 
|-id=122 bgcolor=#d6d6d6
| 261122 ||  || — || October 1, 2005 || Socorro || LINEAR || — || align=right | 2.7 km || 
|-id=123 bgcolor=#E9E9E9
| 261123 ||  || — || October 1, 2005 || Socorro || LINEAR || — || align=right | 2.0 km || 
|-id=124 bgcolor=#d6d6d6
| 261124 ||  || — || October 1, 2005 || Catalina || CSS || — || align=right | 3.0 km || 
|-id=125 bgcolor=#d6d6d6
| 261125 ||  || — || October 1, 2005 || Kitt Peak || Spacewatch || HYG || align=right | 3.0 km || 
|-id=126 bgcolor=#E9E9E9
| 261126 ||  || — || October 1, 2005 || Catalina || CSS || AGN || align=right | 1.7 km || 
|-id=127 bgcolor=#E9E9E9
| 261127 ||  || — || October 1, 2005 || Mount Lemmon || Mount Lemmon Survey || AGN || align=right | 1.6 km || 
|-id=128 bgcolor=#d6d6d6
| 261128 ||  || — || October 1, 2005 || Catalina || CSS || — || align=right | 4.5 km || 
|-id=129 bgcolor=#E9E9E9
| 261129 ||  || — || October 1, 2005 || Catalina || CSS || MRX || align=right | 1.5 km || 
|-id=130 bgcolor=#d6d6d6
| 261130 ||  || — || October 4, 2005 || Palomar || NEAT || INA || align=right | 3.4 km || 
|-id=131 bgcolor=#E9E9E9
| 261131 ||  || — || October 1, 2005 || Kitt Peak || Spacewatch || ADE || align=right | 2.2 km || 
|-id=132 bgcolor=#d6d6d6
| 261132 ||  || — || October 1, 2005 || Kitt Peak || Spacewatch || — || align=right | 3.2 km || 
|-id=133 bgcolor=#E9E9E9
| 261133 ||  || — || October 3, 2005 || Catalina || CSS || — || align=right | 1.7 km || 
|-id=134 bgcolor=#d6d6d6
| 261134 ||  || — || October 5, 2005 || Bergisch Gladbach || W. Bickel || — || align=right | 4.0 km || 
|-id=135 bgcolor=#d6d6d6
| 261135 ||  || — || October 2, 2005 || Kitt Peak || Spacewatch || EUP || align=right | 5.3 km || 
|-id=136 bgcolor=#E9E9E9
| 261136 ||  || — || October 8, 2005 || Moletai || K. Černis, J. Zdanavičius || — || align=right | 2.9 km || 
|-id=137 bgcolor=#d6d6d6
| 261137 ||  || — || October 6, 2005 || Anderson Mesa || LONEOS || — || align=right | 4.5 km || 
|-id=138 bgcolor=#E9E9E9
| 261138 ||  || — || October 1, 2005 || Mount Lemmon || Mount Lemmon Survey || HOF || align=right | 2.4 km || 
|-id=139 bgcolor=#d6d6d6
| 261139 ||  || — || October 1, 2005 || Mount Lemmon || Mount Lemmon Survey || — || align=right | 4.3 km || 
|-id=140 bgcolor=#E9E9E9
| 261140 ||  || — || October 3, 2005 || Catalina || CSS || — || align=right | 2.0 km || 
|-id=141 bgcolor=#d6d6d6
| 261141 ||  || — || October 5, 2005 || Goodricke-Pigott || R. A. Tucker || TRP || align=right | 2.6 km || 
|-id=142 bgcolor=#E9E9E9
| 261142 ||  || — || October 6, 2005 || Mount Lemmon || Mount Lemmon Survey || AGN || align=right | 1.0 km || 
|-id=143 bgcolor=#E9E9E9
| 261143 ||  || — || October 5, 2005 || Catalina || CSS || — || align=right | 2.8 km || 
|-id=144 bgcolor=#E9E9E9
| 261144 ||  || — || October 5, 2005 || Catalina || CSS || — || align=right | 3.4 km || 
|-id=145 bgcolor=#E9E9E9
| 261145 ||  || — || October 5, 2005 || Catalina || CSS || — || align=right | 3.4 km || 
|-id=146 bgcolor=#E9E9E9
| 261146 ||  || — || October 5, 2005 || Catalina || CSS || — || align=right | 4.3 km || 
|-id=147 bgcolor=#d6d6d6
| 261147 ||  || — || October 5, 2005 || Catalina || CSS || — || align=right | 3.1 km || 
|-id=148 bgcolor=#E9E9E9
| 261148 ||  || — || October 5, 2005 || Catalina || CSS || — || align=right | 2.6 km || 
|-id=149 bgcolor=#E9E9E9
| 261149 ||  || — || October 8, 2005 || Catalina || CSS || — || align=right | 2.9 km || 
|-id=150 bgcolor=#d6d6d6
| 261150 ||  || — || October 8, 2005 || Anderson Mesa || LONEOS || — || align=right | 3.4 km || 
|-id=151 bgcolor=#E9E9E9
| 261151 ||  || — || October 3, 2005 || Kitt Peak || Spacewatch || WIT || align=right | 1.1 km || 
|-id=152 bgcolor=#E9E9E9
| 261152 ||  || — || October 3, 2005 || Kitt Peak || Spacewatch || HOF || align=right | 2.8 km || 
|-id=153 bgcolor=#d6d6d6
| 261153 ||  || — || October 3, 2005 || Kitt Peak || Spacewatch || EOS || align=right | 2.6 km || 
|-id=154 bgcolor=#d6d6d6
| 261154 ||  || — || October 5, 2005 || Kitt Peak || Spacewatch || — || align=right | 3.4 km || 
|-id=155 bgcolor=#E9E9E9
| 261155 ||  || — || October 5, 2005 || Kitt Peak || Spacewatch || AST || align=right | 1.8 km || 
|-id=156 bgcolor=#d6d6d6
| 261156 ||  || — || October 6, 2005 || Mount Lemmon || Mount Lemmon Survey || — || align=right | 2.4 km || 
|-id=157 bgcolor=#d6d6d6
| 261157 ||  || — || October 6, 2005 || Catalina || CSS || — || align=right | 5.1 km || 
|-id=158 bgcolor=#d6d6d6
| 261158 ||  || — || October 6, 2005 || Kitt Peak || Spacewatch || CHA || align=right | 2.3 km || 
|-id=159 bgcolor=#d6d6d6
| 261159 ||  || — || October 6, 2005 || Mount Lemmon || Mount Lemmon Survey || — || align=right | 3.6 km || 
|-id=160 bgcolor=#E9E9E9
| 261160 ||  || — || October 7, 2005 || Socorro || LINEAR || — || align=right | 2.7 km || 
|-id=161 bgcolor=#E9E9E9
| 261161 ||  || — || October 7, 2005 || Kitt Peak || Spacewatch || AGN || align=right | 1.5 km || 
|-id=162 bgcolor=#E9E9E9
| 261162 ||  || — || October 7, 2005 || Kitt Peak || Spacewatch || — || align=right | 3.0 km || 
|-id=163 bgcolor=#d6d6d6
| 261163 ||  || — || October 7, 2005 || Catalina || CSS || — || align=right | 2.9 km || 
|-id=164 bgcolor=#d6d6d6
| 261164 ||  || — || October 7, 2005 || Mount Lemmon || Mount Lemmon Survey || HYG || align=right | 3.1 km || 
|-id=165 bgcolor=#d6d6d6
| 261165 ||  || — || October 7, 2005 || Mount Lemmon || Mount Lemmon Survey || KOR || align=right | 1.7 km || 
|-id=166 bgcolor=#d6d6d6
| 261166 ||  || — || October 8, 2005 || Bergisch Gladbac || W. Bickel || 615 || align=right | 1.9 km || 
|-id=167 bgcolor=#d6d6d6
| 261167 ||  || — || October 8, 2005 || Catalina || CSS || — || align=right | 2.6 km || 
|-id=168 bgcolor=#d6d6d6
| 261168 ||  || — || October 8, 2005 || Socorro || LINEAR || — || align=right | 3.9 km || 
|-id=169 bgcolor=#d6d6d6
| 261169 ||  || — || October 7, 2005 || Kitt Peak || Spacewatch || — || align=right | 2.7 km || 
|-id=170 bgcolor=#E9E9E9
| 261170 ||  || — || October 7, 2005 || Kitt Peak || Spacewatch || — || align=right | 1.4 km || 
|-id=171 bgcolor=#E9E9E9
| 261171 ||  || — || October 7, 2005 || Kitt Peak || Spacewatch || PAD || align=right | 1.8 km || 
|-id=172 bgcolor=#E9E9E9
| 261172 ||  || — || October 7, 2005 || Kitt Peak || Spacewatch || KON || align=right | 3.5 km || 
|-id=173 bgcolor=#d6d6d6
| 261173 ||  || — || October 7, 2005 || Kitt Peak || Spacewatch || KAR || align=right | 1.1 km || 
|-id=174 bgcolor=#d6d6d6
| 261174 ||  || — || October 7, 2005 || Kitt Peak || Spacewatch || — || align=right | 3.1 km || 
|-id=175 bgcolor=#E9E9E9
| 261175 ||  || — || October 7, 2005 || Kitt Peak || Spacewatch || AGN || align=right | 1.7 km || 
|-id=176 bgcolor=#d6d6d6
| 261176 ||  || — || October 7, 2005 || Kitt Peak || Spacewatch || — || align=right | 2.2 km || 
|-id=177 bgcolor=#d6d6d6
| 261177 ||  || — || October 7, 2005 || Kitt Peak || Spacewatch || KOR || align=right | 1.8 km || 
|-id=178 bgcolor=#d6d6d6
| 261178 ||  || — || October 7, 2005 || Kitt Peak || Spacewatch || KOR || align=right | 1.6 km || 
|-id=179 bgcolor=#d6d6d6
| 261179 ||  || — || October 7, 2005 || Kitt Peak || Spacewatch || — || align=right | 3.1 km || 
|-id=180 bgcolor=#d6d6d6
| 261180 ||  || — || October 7, 2005 || Kitt Peak || Spacewatch || — || align=right | 3.3 km || 
|-id=181 bgcolor=#E9E9E9
| 261181 ||  || — || October 7, 2005 || Kitt Peak || Spacewatch || — || align=right | 3.0 km || 
|-id=182 bgcolor=#d6d6d6
| 261182 ||  || — || October 7, 2005 || Kitt Peak || Spacewatch || — || align=right | 4.3 km || 
|-id=183 bgcolor=#E9E9E9
| 261183 ||  || — || October 6, 2005 || Kitt Peak || Spacewatch || — || align=right | 2.3 km || 
|-id=184 bgcolor=#E9E9E9
| 261184 ||  || — || October 6, 2005 || Kitt Peak || Spacewatch || — || align=right | 1.3 km || 
|-id=185 bgcolor=#E9E9E9
| 261185 ||  || — || October 6, 2005 || Kitt Peak || Spacewatch || — || align=right | 2.2 km || 
|-id=186 bgcolor=#E9E9E9
| 261186 ||  || — || October 6, 2005 || Kitt Peak || Spacewatch || — || align=right | 2.3 km || 
|-id=187 bgcolor=#E9E9E9
| 261187 ||  || — || October 8, 2005 || Kitt Peak || Spacewatch || NEM || align=right | 2.8 km || 
|-id=188 bgcolor=#E9E9E9
| 261188 ||  || — || October 8, 2005 || Kitt Peak || Spacewatch || — || align=right | 2.1 km || 
|-id=189 bgcolor=#d6d6d6
| 261189 ||  || — || October 8, 2005 || Kitt Peak || Spacewatch || 7:4 || align=right | 5.1 km || 
|-id=190 bgcolor=#d6d6d6
| 261190 ||  || — || October 8, 2005 || Kitt Peak || Spacewatch || — || align=right | 5.4 km || 
|-id=191 bgcolor=#E9E9E9
| 261191 ||  || — || October 8, 2005 || Kitt Peak || Spacewatch || — || align=right | 1.8 km || 
|-id=192 bgcolor=#E9E9E9
| 261192 ||  || — || October 8, 2005 || Kitt Peak || Spacewatch || HOF || align=right | 3.1 km || 
|-id=193 bgcolor=#E9E9E9
| 261193 ||  || — || October 11, 2005 || Kitt Peak || Spacewatch || — || align=right | 1.3 km || 
|-id=194 bgcolor=#E9E9E9
| 261194 ||  || — || October 9, 2005 || Kitt Peak || Spacewatch || — || align=right | 2.3 km || 
|-id=195 bgcolor=#E9E9E9
| 261195 ||  || — || October 9, 2005 || Kitt Peak || Spacewatch || — || align=right | 2.4 km || 
|-id=196 bgcolor=#d6d6d6
| 261196 ||  || — || October 9, 2005 || Kitt Peak || Spacewatch || EOS || align=right | 2.4 km || 
|-id=197 bgcolor=#E9E9E9
| 261197 ||  || — || October 9, 2005 || Kitt Peak || Spacewatch || AGN || align=right | 1.3 km || 
|-id=198 bgcolor=#E9E9E9
| 261198 ||  || — || October 9, 2005 || Kitt Peak || Spacewatch || — || align=right | 1.8 km || 
|-id=199 bgcolor=#d6d6d6
| 261199 ||  || — || October 9, 2005 || Kitt Peak || Spacewatch || — || align=right | 3.5 km || 
|-id=200 bgcolor=#E9E9E9
| 261200 ||  || — || October 9, 2005 || Kitt Peak || Spacewatch || — || align=right | 2.4 km || 
|}

261201–261300 

|-bgcolor=#d6d6d6
| 261201 ||  || — || October 9, 2005 || Kitt Peak || Spacewatch || KOR || align=right | 1.3 km || 
|-id=202 bgcolor=#d6d6d6
| 261202 ||  || — || October 10, 2005 || Catalina || CSS || — || align=right | 5.1 km || 
|-id=203 bgcolor=#E9E9E9
| 261203 ||  || — || October 10, 2005 || Anderson Mesa || LONEOS || — || align=right | 4.2 km || 
|-id=204 bgcolor=#E9E9E9
| 261204 ||  || — || October 10, 2005 || Catalina || CSS || — || align=right | 1.9 km || 
|-id=205 bgcolor=#E9E9E9
| 261205 ||  || — || October 1, 2005 || Mount Lemmon || Mount Lemmon Survey || HOF || align=right | 2.7 km || 
|-id=206 bgcolor=#d6d6d6
| 261206 ||  || — || October 2, 2005 || Mount Lemmon || Mount Lemmon Survey || — || align=right | 2.1 km || 
|-id=207 bgcolor=#E9E9E9
| 261207 ||  || — || October 6, 2005 || Mount Lemmon || Mount Lemmon Survey || — || align=right | 2.6 km || 
|-id=208 bgcolor=#E9E9E9
| 261208 ||  || — || October 7, 2005 || Socorro || LINEAR || — || align=right | 2.5 km || 
|-id=209 bgcolor=#E9E9E9
| 261209 ||  || — || October 13, 2005 || Kitt Peak || Spacewatch || — || align=right | 1.6 km || 
|-id=210 bgcolor=#E9E9E9
| 261210 ||  || — || October 1, 2005 || Anderson Mesa || LONEOS || AGN || align=right | 1.7 km || 
|-id=211 bgcolor=#E9E9E9
| 261211 ||  || — || October 9, 2005 || Kitt Peak || Spacewatch || — || align=right | 3.3 km || 
|-id=212 bgcolor=#E9E9E9
| 261212 ||  || — || October 3, 2005 || Catalina || CSS || — || align=right | 1.7 km || 
|-id=213 bgcolor=#E9E9E9
| 261213 ||  || — || October 26, 2005 || Socorro || LINEAR || HNS || align=right | 1.9 km || 
|-id=214 bgcolor=#E9E9E9
| 261214 ||  || — || October 26, 2005 || Ottmarsheim || C. Rinner || — || align=right | 1.9 km || 
|-id=215 bgcolor=#E9E9E9
| 261215 ||  || — || October 22, 2005 || Catalina || CSS || AGN || align=right | 1.8 km || 
|-id=216 bgcolor=#d6d6d6
| 261216 ||  || — || October 22, 2005 || Kitt Peak || Spacewatch || KOR || align=right | 1.7 km || 
|-id=217 bgcolor=#E9E9E9
| 261217 ||  || — || October 23, 2005 || Kitt Peak || Spacewatch || — || align=right | 2.8 km || 
|-id=218 bgcolor=#E9E9E9
| 261218 ||  || — || October 23, 2005 || Kitt Peak || Spacewatch || HOF || align=right | 2.8 km || 
|-id=219 bgcolor=#E9E9E9
| 261219 ||  || — || October 23, 2005 || Kitt Peak || Spacewatch || — || align=right | 1.9 km || 
|-id=220 bgcolor=#d6d6d6
| 261220 ||  || — || October 23, 2005 || Kitt Peak || Spacewatch || KOR || align=right | 1.2 km || 
|-id=221 bgcolor=#E9E9E9
| 261221 ||  || — || October 23, 2005 || Kitt Peak || Spacewatch || WIT || align=right | 1.1 km || 
|-id=222 bgcolor=#d6d6d6
| 261222 ||  || — || October 23, 2005 || Kitt Peak || Spacewatch || — || align=right | 2.5 km || 
|-id=223 bgcolor=#d6d6d6
| 261223 ||  || — || October 23, 2005 || Kitt Peak || Spacewatch || THM || align=right | 2.6 km || 
|-id=224 bgcolor=#E9E9E9
| 261224 ||  || — || October 23, 2005 || Catalina || CSS || — || align=right | 2.6 km || 
|-id=225 bgcolor=#d6d6d6
| 261225 ||  || — || October 23, 2005 || Catalina || CSS || — || align=right | 4.8 km || 
|-id=226 bgcolor=#E9E9E9
| 261226 ||  || — || October 24, 2005 || Kitt Peak || Spacewatch || — || align=right | 1.6 km || 
|-id=227 bgcolor=#d6d6d6
| 261227 ||  || — || October 24, 2005 || Kitt Peak || Spacewatch || — || align=right | 2.4 km || 
|-id=228 bgcolor=#E9E9E9
| 261228 ||  || — || October 24, 2005 || Kitt Peak || Spacewatch || AST || align=right | 2.1 km || 
|-id=229 bgcolor=#d6d6d6
| 261229 ||  || — || October 24, 2005 || Kitt Peak || Spacewatch || — || align=right | 2.4 km || 
|-id=230 bgcolor=#E9E9E9
| 261230 ||  || — || October 24, 2005 || Kitt Peak || Spacewatch || AGN || align=right | 1.2 km || 
|-id=231 bgcolor=#d6d6d6
| 261231 ||  || — || October 24, 2005 || Kitt Peak || Spacewatch || — || align=right | 4.2 km || 
|-id=232 bgcolor=#d6d6d6
| 261232 ||  || — || October 24, 2005 || Kitt Peak || Spacewatch || — || align=right | 2.7 km || 
|-id=233 bgcolor=#d6d6d6
| 261233 ||  || — || October 24, 2005 || Kitt Peak || Spacewatch || — || align=right | 3.7 km || 
|-id=234 bgcolor=#E9E9E9
| 261234 ||  || — || October 22, 2005 || Catalina || CSS || AGN || align=right | 1.5 km || 
|-id=235 bgcolor=#d6d6d6
| 261235 ||  || — || October 22, 2005 || Kitt Peak || Spacewatch || — || align=right | 2.2 km || 
|-id=236 bgcolor=#E9E9E9
| 261236 ||  || — || October 22, 2005 || Kitt Peak || Spacewatch || GAL || align=right | 2.0 km || 
|-id=237 bgcolor=#E9E9E9
| 261237 ||  || — || October 23, 2005 || Catalina || CSS || — || align=right | 2.6 km || 
|-id=238 bgcolor=#d6d6d6
| 261238 ||  || — || October 23, 2005 || Catalina || CSS || — || align=right | 4.1 km || 
|-id=239 bgcolor=#E9E9E9
| 261239 ||  || — || October 23, 2005 || Catalina || CSS || — || align=right | 2.8 km || 
|-id=240 bgcolor=#d6d6d6
| 261240 ||  || — || October 23, 2005 || Catalina || CSS || — || align=right | 4.3 km || 
|-id=241 bgcolor=#E9E9E9
| 261241 ||  || — || October 23, 2005 || Catalina || CSS || — || align=right | 2.0 km || 
|-id=242 bgcolor=#d6d6d6
| 261242 ||  || — || October 23, 2005 || Catalina || CSS || HYG || align=right | 4.9 km || 
|-id=243 bgcolor=#E9E9E9
| 261243 ||  || — || October 23, 2005 || Catalina || CSS || AGN || align=right | 1.6 km || 
|-id=244 bgcolor=#E9E9E9
| 261244 ||  || — || October 23, 2005 || Catalina || CSS || HOF || align=right | 3.1 km || 
|-id=245 bgcolor=#E9E9E9
| 261245 ||  || — || October 25, 2005 || Kitt Peak || Spacewatch || — || align=right | 1.7 km || 
|-id=246 bgcolor=#E9E9E9
| 261246 ||  || — || October 25, 2005 || Anderson Mesa || LONEOS || WIT || align=right | 1.6 km || 
|-id=247 bgcolor=#E9E9E9
| 261247 ||  || — || October 25, 2005 || Mount Lemmon || Mount Lemmon Survey || — || align=right | 1.8 km || 
|-id=248 bgcolor=#d6d6d6
| 261248 ||  || — || October 22, 2005 || Palomar || NEAT || — || align=right | 3.6 km || 
|-id=249 bgcolor=#d6d6d6
| 261249 ||  || — || October 23, 2005 || Palomar || NEAT || — || align=right | 4.4 km || 
|-id=250 bgcolor=#E9E9E9
| 261250 ||  || — || October 24, 2005 || Palomar || NEAT || — || align=right | 2.4 km || 
|-id=251 bgcolor=#d6d6d6
| 261251 ||  || — || October 25, 2005 || Catalina || CSS || — || align=right | 5.6 km || 
|-id=252 bgcolor=#d6d6d6
| 261252 ||  || — || October 22, 2005 || Kitt Peak || Spacewatch || — || align=right | 2.0 km || 
|-id=253 bgcolor=#E9E9E9
| 261253 ||  || — || October 22, 2005 || Kitt Peak || Spacewatch || — || align=right | 2.5 km || 
|-id=254 bgcolor=#d6d6d6
| 261254 ||  || — || October 22, 2005 || Kitt Peak || Spacewatch || — || align=right | 2.7 km || 
|-id=255 bgcolor=#d6d6d6
| 261255 ||  || — || October 22, 2005 || Kitt Peak || Spacewatch || — || align=right | 3.2 km || 
|-id=256 bgcolor=#E9E9E9
| 261256 ||  || — || October 22, 2005 || Kitt Peak || Spacewatch || — || align=right | 2.9 km || 
|-id=257 bgcolor=#d6d6d6
| 261257 ||  || — || October 22, 2005 || Kitt Peak || Spacewatch || — || align=right | 4.2 km || 
|-id=258 bgcolor=#d6d6d6
| 261258 ||  || — || October 22, 2005 || Kitt Peak || Spacewatch || — || align=right | 3.2 km || 
|-id=259 bgcolor=#d6d6d6
| 261259 ||  || — || October 22, 2005 || Kitt Peak || Spacewatch || — || align=right | 2.8 km || 
|-id=260 bgcolor=#E9E9E9
| 261260 ||  || — || October 22, 2005 || Kitt Peak || Spacewatch || — || align=right | 2.4 km || 
|-id=261 bgcolor=#d6d6d6
| 261261 ||  || — || October 22, 2005 || Kitt Peak || Spacewatch || 628 || align=right | 1.7 km || 
|-id=262 bgcolor=#E9E9E9
| 261262 ||  || — || October 22, 2005 || Kitt Peak || Spacewatch || — || align=right | 1.6 km || 
|-id=263 bgcolor=#d6d6d6
| 261263 ||  || — || October 22, 2005 || Kitt Peak || Spacewatch || — || align=right | 4.3 km || 
|-id=264 bgcolor=#E9E9E9
| 261264 ||  || — || October 22, 2005 || Kitt Peak || Spacewatch || — || align=right | 2.8 km || 
|-id=265 bgcolor=#d6d6d6
| 261265 ||  || — || October 22, 2005 || Kitt Peak || Spacewatch || — || align=right | 2.9 km || 
|-id=266 bgcolor=#d6d6d6
| 261266 ||  || — || October 22, 2005 || Kitt Peak || Spacewatch || KOR || align=right | 1.9 km || 
|-id=267 bgcolor=#d6d6d6
| 261267 ||  || — || October 22, 2005 || Kitt Peak || Spacewatch || — || align=right | 2.2 km || 
|-id=268 bgcolor=#d6d6d6
| 261268 ||  || — || October 22, 2005 || Kitt Peak || Spacewatch || — || align=right | 3.4 km || 
|-id=269 bgcolor=#E9E9E9
| 261269 ||  || — || October 22, 2005 || Kitt Peak || Spacewatch || — || align=right | 2.7 km || 
|-id=270 bgcolor=#d6d6d6
| 261270 ||  || — || October 22, 2005 || Palomar || NEAT || — || align=right | 4.2 km || 
|-id=271 bgcolor=#d6d6d6
| 261271 ||  || — || October 24, 2005 || Kitt Peak || Spacewatch || — || align=right | 3.9 km || 
|-id=272 bgcolor=#E9E9E9
| 261272 ||  || — || October 24, 2005 || Kitt Peak || Spacewatch || — || align=right | 2.8 km || 
|-id=273 bgcolor=#E9E9E9
| 261273 ||  || — || October 24, 2005 || Kitt Peak || Spacewatch || — || align=right | 2.6 km || 
|-id=274 bgcolor=#E9E9E9
| 261274 ||  || — || October 24, 2005 || Kitt Peak || Spacewatch || — || align=right | 2.4 km || 
|-id=275 bgcolor=#d6d6d6
| 261275 ||  || — || October 24, 2005 || Kitt Peak || Spacewatch || — || align=right | 2.9 km || 
|-id=276 bgcolor=#d6d6d6
| 261276 ||  || — || October 24, 2005 || Palomar || NEAT || — || align=right | 5.9 km || 
|-id=277 bgcolor=#E9E9E9
| 261277 ||  || — || October 25, 2005 || Mount Lemmon || Mount Lemmon Survey || — || align=right | 2.7 km || 
|-id=278 bgcolor=#E9E9E9
| 261278 ||  || — || October 25, 2005 || Kitt Peak || Spacewatch || — || align=right | 2.0 km || 
|-id=279 bgcolor=#d6d6d6
| 261279 ||  || — || October 25, 2005 || Kitt Peak || Spacewatch || — || align=right | 4.4 km || 
|-id=280 bgcolor=#d6d6d6
| 261280 ||  || — || October 25, 2005 || Mount Lemmon || Mount Lemmon Survey || — || align=right | 2.7 km || 
|-id=281 bgcolor=#d6d6d6
| 261281 ||  || — || October 25, 2005 || Catalina || CSS || — || align=right | 3.4 km || 
|-id=282 bgcolor=#E9E9E9
| 261282 ||  || — || October 25, 2005 || Mount Lemmon || Mount Lemmon Survey || AGN || align=right | 1.4 km || 
|-id=283 bgcolor=#d6d6d6
| 261283 ||  || — || October 26, 2005 || Kitt Peak || Spacewatch || — || align=right | 5.8 km || 
|-id=284 bgcolor=#E9E9E9
| 261284 ||  || — || October 26, 2005 || Kitt Peak || Spacewatch || — || align=right | 2.1 km || 
|-id=285 bgcolor=#E9E9E9
| 261285 ||  || — || October 26, 2005 || Kitt Peak || Spacewatch || AGN || align=right | 1.5 km || 
|-id=286 bgcolor=#d6d6d6
| 261286 ||  || — || October 26, 2005 || Kitt Peak || Spacewatch || — || align=right | 4.1 km || 
|-id=287 bgcolor=#E9E9E9
| 261287 ||  || — || October 26, 2005 || Kitt Peak || Spacewatch || — || align=right | 2.3 km || 
|-id=288 bgcolor=#d6d6d6
| 261288 ||  || — || October 26, 2005 || Kitt Peak || Spacewatch || KOR || align=right | 1.6 km || 
|-id=289 bgcolor=#d6d6d6
| 261289 ||  || — || October 26, 2005 || Kitt Peak || Spacewatch || — || align=right | 2.7 km || 
|-id=290 bgcolor=#E9E9E9
| 261290 ||  || — || October 26, 2005 || Palomar || NEAT || — || align=right | 3.2 km || 
|-id=291 bgcolor=#d6d6d6
| 261291 Fucecchio ||  ||  || October 31, 2005 || Andrushivka || Andrushivka Obs. || — || align=right | 2.7 km || 
|-id=292 bgcolor=#E9E9E9
| 261292 ||  || — || October 27, 2005 || Socorro || LINEAR || — || align=right | 2.4 km || 
|-id=293 bgcolor=#E9E9E9
| 261293 ||  || — || October 27, 2005 || Socorro || LINEAR || — || align=right | 3.8 km || 
|-id=294 bgcolor=#E9E9E9
| 261294 ||  || — || October 24, 2005 || Kitt Peak || Spacewatch || — || align=right | 2.0 km || 
|-id=295 bgcolor=#E9E9E9
| 261295 ||  || — || October 24, 2005 || Kitt Peak || Spacewatch || — || align=right | 2.0 km || 
|-id=296 bgcolor=#E9E9E9
| 261296 ||  || — || October 24, 2005 || Kitt Peak || Spacewatch || HEN || align=right | 1.3 km || 
|-id=297 bgcolor=#E9E9E9
| 261297 ||  || — || October 24, 2005 || Kitt Peak || Spacewatch || — || align=right | 2.2 km || 
|-id=298 bgcolor=#d6d6d6
| 261298 ||  || — || October 24, 2005 || Kitt Peak || Spacewatch || — || align=right | 2.6 km || 
|-id=299 bgcolor=#d6d6d6
| 261299 ||  || — || October 24, 2005 || Kitt Peak || Spacewatch || — || align=right | 4.0 km || 
|-id=300 bgcolor=#d6d6d6
| 261300 ||  || — || October 24, 2005 || Kitt Peak || Spacewatch || KOR || align=right | 2.0 km || 
|}

261301–261400 

|-bgcolor=#d6d6d6
| 261301 ||  || — || October 24, 2005 || Kitt Peak || Spacewatch || K-2 || align=right | 1.6 km || 
|-id=302 bgcolor=#d6d6d6
| 261302 ||  || — || October 24, 2005 || Kitt Peak || Spacewatch || — || align=right | 2.6 km || 
|-id=303 bgcolor=#d6d6d6
| 261303 ||  || — || October 24, 2005 || Kitt Peak || Spacewatch || K-2 || align=right | 1.5 km || 
|-id=304 bgcolor=#d6d6d6
| 261304 ||  || — || October 25, 2005 || Mount Lemmon || Mount Lemmon Survey || KOR || align=right | 1.3 km || 
|-id=305 bgcolor=#d6d6d6
| 261305 ||  || — || October 22, 2005 || Kitt Peak || Spacewatch || THM || align=right | 2.4 km || 
|-id=306 bgcolor=#E9E9E9
| 261306 ||  || — || October 24, 2005 || Kitt Peak || Spacewatch || — || align=right | 1.6 km || 
|-id=307 bgcolor=#E9E9E9
| 261307 ||  || — || October 24, 2005 || Kitt Peak || Spacewatch || HOF || align=right | 3.2 km || 
|-id=308 bgcolor=#E9E9E9
| 261308 ||  || — || October 25, 2005 || Kitt Peak || Spacewatch || AST || align=right | 1.8 km || 
|-id=309 bgcolor=#d6d6d6
| 261309 ||  || — || October 25, 2005 || Kitt Peak || Spacewatch || KOR || align=right | 1.7 km || 
|-id=310 bgcolor=#d6d6d6
| 261310 ||  || — || October 25, 2005 || Kitt Peak || Spacewatch || — || align=right | 3.9 km || 
|-id=311 bgcolor=#E9E9E9
| 261311 ||  || — || October 25, 2005 || Kitt Peak || Spacewatch || AGN || align=right | 1.7 km || 
|-id=312 bgcolor=#d6d6d6
| 261312 ||  || — || October 25, 2005 || Mount Lemmon || Mount Lemmon Survey || — || align=right | 2.4 km || 
|-id=313 bgcolor=#d6d6d6
| 261313 ||  || — || October 25, 2005 || Mount Lemmon || Mount Lemmon Survey || — || align=right | 3.0 km || 
|-id=314 bgcolor=#d6d6d6
| 261314 ||  || — || October 25, 2005 || Mount Lemmon || Mount Lemmon Survey || AST || align=right | 1.9 km || 
|-id=315 bgcolor=#d6d6d6
| 261315 ||  || — || October 25, 2005 || Mount Lemmon || Mount Lemmon Survey || — || align=right | 3.0 km || 
|-id=316 bgcolor=#E9E9E9
| 261316 ||  || — || October 26, 2005 || Mount Lemmon || Mount Lemmon Survey || HEN || align=right | 1.1 km || 
|-id=317 bgcolor=#d6d6d6
| 261317 ||  || — || October 26, 2005 || Mount Lemmon || Mount Lemmon Survey || EOS || align=right | 1.7 km || 
|-id=318 bgcolor=#E9E9E9
| 261318 ||  || — || October 27, 2005 || Kitt Peak || Spacewatch || — || align=right | 2.2 km || 
|-id=319 bgcolor=#d6d6d6
| 261319 ||  || — || October 27, 2005 || Kitt Peak || Spacewatch || YAK || align=right | 3.4 km || 
|-id=320 bgcolor=#E9E9E9
| 261320 ||  || — || October 27, 2005 || Palomar || NEAT || — || align=right | 2.2 km || 
|-id=321 bgcolor=#E9E9E9
| 261321 ||  || — || October 27, 2005 || Catalina || CSS || — || align=right | 1.5 km || 
|-id=322 bgcolor=#E9E9E9
| 261322 ||  || — || October 25, 2005 || Kitt Peak || Spacewatch || — || align=right | 3.0 km || 
|-id=323 bgcolor=#E9E9E9
| 261323 ||  || — || October 25, 2005 || Kitt Peak || Spacewatch || — || align=right | 2.1 km || 
|-id=324 bgcolor=#d6d6d6
| 261324 ||  || — || October 25, 2005 || Kitt Peak || Spacewatch || — || align=right | 4.7 km || 
|-id=325 bgcolor=#d6d6d6
| 261325 ||  || — || October 25, 2005 || Kitt Peak || Spacewatch || — || align=right | 4.6 km || 
|-id=326 bgcolor=#d6d6d6
| 261326 ||  || — || October 25, 2005 || Mount Lemmon || Mount Lemmon Survey || — || align=right | 2.7 km || 
|-id=327 bgcolor=#d6d6d6
| 261327 ||  || — || October 25, 2005 || Mount Lemmon || Mount Lemmon Survey || — || align=right | 2.8 km || 
|-id=328 bgcolor=#d6d6d6
| 261328 ||  || — || October 25, 2005 || Mount Lemmon || Mount Lemmon Survey || — || align=right | 3.1 km || 
|-id=329 bgcolor=#d6d6d6
| 261329 ||  || — || October 25, 2005 || Kitt Peak || Spacewatch || — || align=right | 2.8 km || 
|-id=330 bgcolor=#E9E9E9
| 261330 ||  || — || October 25, 2005 || Kitt Peak || Spacewatch || — || align=right | 3.2 km || 
|-id=331 bgcolor=#d6d6d6
| 261331 ||  || — || October 25, 2005 || Kitt Peak || Spacewatch || — || align=right | 4.5 km || 
|-id=332 bgcolor=#d6d6d6
| 261332 ||  || — || October 25, 2005 || Kitt Peak || Spacewatch || — || align=right | 3.3 km || 
|-id=333 bgcolor=#d6d6d6
| 261333 ||  || — || October 27, 2005 || Kitt Peak || Spacewatch || — || align=right | 2.9 km || 
|-id=334 bgcolor=#d6d6d6
| 261334 ||  || — || October 27, 2005 || Mount Lemmon || Mount Lemmon Survey || KOR || align=right | 1.8 km || 
|-id=335 bgcolor=#d6d6d6
| 261335 ||  || — || October 28, 2005 || Mount Lemmon || Mount Lemmon Survey || — || align=right | 2.3 km || 
|-id=336 bgcolor=#d6d6d6
| 261336 ||  || — || October 23, 2005 || Palomar || NEAT || — || align=right | 3.8 km || 
|-id=337 bgcolor=#d6d6d6
| 261337 ||  || — || October 26, 2005 || Kitt Peak || Spacewatch || EOS || align=right | 3.2 km || 
|-id=338 bgcolor=#E9E9E9
| 261338 ||  || — || October 24, 2005 || Kitt Peak || Spacewatch || — || align=right | 2.7 km || 
|-id=339 bgcolor=#d6d6d6
| 261339 ||  || — || October 25, 2005 || Kitt Peak || Spacewatch || — || align=right | 3.3 km || 
|-id=340 bgcolor=#d6d6d6
| 261340 ||  || — || October 25, 2005 || Kitt Peak || Spacewatch || — || align=right | 3.2 km || 
|-id=341 bgcolor=#d6d6d6
| 261341 ||  || — || October 25, 2005 || Mount Lemmon || Mount Lemmon Survey || THM || align=right | 2.5 km || 
|-id=342 bgcolor=#d6d6d6
| 261342 ||  || — || October 27, 2005 || Kitt Peak || Spacewatch || — || align=right | 2.3 km || 
|-id=343 bgcolor=#d6d6d6
| 261343 ||  || — || October 27, 2005 || Kitt Peak || Spacewatch || — || align=right | 2.9 km || 
|-id=344 bgcolor=#d6d6d6
| 261344 ||  || — || October 27, 2005 || Kitt Peak || Spacewatch || — || align=right | 3.1 km || 
|-id=345 bgcolor=#E9E9E9
| 261345 ||  || — || October 23, 2005 || Palomar || NEAT || ADE || align=right | 3.8 km || 
|-id=346 bgcolor=#d6d6d6
| 261346 ||  || — || October 24, 2005 || Kitt Peak || Spacewatch || KOR || align=right | 1.4 km || 
|-id=347 bgcolor=#E9E9E9
| 261347 ||  || — || October 24, 2005 || Kitt Peak || Spacewatch || — || align=right | 1.9 km || 
|-id=348 bgcolor=#d6d6d6
| 261348 ||  || — || October 24, 2005 || Kitt Peak || Spacewatch || THM || align=right | 2.3 km || 
|-id=349 bgcolor=#E9E9E9
| 261349 ||  || — || October 26, 2005 || Kitt Peak || Spacewatch || — || align=right | 1.6 km || 
|-id=350 bgcolor=#E9E9E9
| 261350 ||  || — || October 26, 2005 || Kitt Peak || Spacewatch || — || align=right | 2.8 km || 
|-id=351 bgcolor=#d6d6d6
| 261351 ||  || — || October 26, 2005 || Kitt Peak || Spacewatch || — || align=right | 4.5 km || 
|-id=352 bgcolor=#E9E9E9
| 261352 ||  || — || October 26, 2005 || Kitt Peak || Spacewatch || — || align=right | 2.9 km || 
|-id=353 bgcolor=#d6d6d6
| 261353 ||  || — || October 26, 2005 || Kitt Peak || Spacewatch || — || align=right | 3.1 km || 
|-id=354 bgcolor=#E9E9E9
| 261354 ||  || — || October 26, 2005 || Kitt Peak || Spacewatch || — || align=right | 3.1 km || 
|-id=355 bgcolor=#E9E9E9
| 261355 ||  || — || October 26, 2005 || Kitt Peak || Spacewatch || — || align=right | 3.3 km || 
|-id=356 bgcolor=#d6d6d6
| 261356 ||  || — || October 26, 2005 || Kitt Peak || Spacewatch || — || align=right | 4.1 km || 
|-id=357 bgcolor=#E9E9E9
| 261357 ||  || — || October 29, 2005 || Catalina || CSS || — || align=right | 2.5 km || 
|-id=358 bgcolor=#d6d6d6
| 261358 ||  || — || October 27, 2005 || Socorro || LINEAR || — || align=right | 3.7 km || 
|-id=359 bgcolor=#d6d6d6
| 261359 ||  || — || October 28, 2005 || Catalina || CSS || EOS || align=right | 3.3 km || 
|-id=360 bgcolor=#d6d6d6
| 261360 ||  || — || October 25, 2005 || Kitt Peak || Spacewatch || KOR || align=right | 1.7 km || 
|-id=361 bgcolor=#E9E9E9
| 261361 ||  || — || October 27, 2005 || Kitt Peak || Spacewatch || HOF || align=right | 3.4 km || 
|-id=362 bgcolor=#d6d6d6
| 261362 ||  || — || October 27, 2005 || Kitt Peak || Spacewatch || — || align=right | 3.6 km || 
|-id=363 bgcolor=#E9E9E9
| 261363 ||  || — || October 29, 2005 || Mount Lemmon || Mount Lemmon Survey || PAD || align=right | 2.4 km || 
|-id=364 bgcolor=#d6d6d6
| 261364 ||  || — || October 29, 2005 || Catalina || CSS || — || align=right | 2.9 km || 
|-id=365 bgcolor=#E9E9E9
| 261365 ||  || — || October 28, 2005 || Mount Lemmon || Mount Lemmon Survey || HEN || align=right | 1.1 km || 
|-id=366 bgcolor=#d6d6d6
| 261366 ||  || — || October 28, 2005 || Kitt Peak || Spacewatch || — || align=right | 2.8 km || 
|-id=367 bgcolor=#d6d6d6
| 261367 ||  || — || October 31, 2005 || Kitt Peak || Spacewatch || — || align=right | 4.4 km || 
|-id=368 bgcolor=#E9E9E9
| 261368 ||  || — || October 31, 2005 || Mount Lemmon || Mount Lemmon Survey || — || align=right | 3.3 km || 
|-id=369 bgcolor=#E9E9E9
| 261369 ||  || — || October 31, 2005 || Mount Lemmon || Mount Lemmon Survey || GEF || align=right | 1.6 km || 
|-id=370 bgcolor=#E9E9E9
| 261370 ||  || — || October 28, 2005 || Catalina || CSS || — || align=right | 1.8 km || 
|-id=371 bgcolor=#d6d6d6
| 261371 ||  || — || October 29, 2005 || Catalina || CSS || CHA || align=right | 3.1 km || 
|-id=372 bgcolor=#d6d6d6
| 261372 ||  || — || October 29, 2005 || Catalina || CSS || BRA || align=right | 2.4 km || 
|-id=373 bgcolor=#d6d6d6
| 261373 ||  || — || October 29, 2005 || Catalina || CSS || EUP || align=right | 5.7 km || 
|-id=374 bgcolor=#d6d6d6
| 261374 ||  || — || October 29, 2005 || Kitt Peak || Spacewatch || EUP || align=right | 5.4 km || 
|-id=375 bgcolor=#d6d6d6
| 261375 ||  || — || October 30, 2005 || Mount Lemmon || Mount Lemmon Survey || — || align=right | 4.2 km || 
|-id=376 bgcolor=#d6d6d6
| 261376 ||  || — || October 30, 2005 || Catalina || CSS || — || align=right | 3.4 km || 
|-id=377 bgcolor=#d6d6d6
| 261377 ||  || — || October 24, 2005 || Kitt Peak || Spacewatch || SYL7:4 || align=right | 5.1 km || 
|-id=378 bgcolor=#d6d6d6
| 261378 ||  || — || October 27, 2005 || Kitt Peak || Spacewatch || — || align=right | 3.0 km || 
|-id=379 bgcolor=#E9E9E9
| 261379 ||  || — || October 27, 2005 || Kitt Peak || Spacewatch || HOF || align=right | 3.4 km || 
|-id=380 bgcolor=#d6d6d6
| 261380 ||  || — || October 27, 2005 || Kitt Peak || Spacewatch || — || align=right | 2.8 km || 
|-id=381 bgcolor=#d6d6d6
| 261381 ||  || — || October 27, 2005 || Kitt Peak || Spacewatch || EOS || align=right | 2.2 km || 
|-id=382 bgcolor=#E9E9E9
| 261382 ||  || — || October 27, 2005 || Kitt Peak || Spacewatch || HEN || align=right | 1.1 km || 
|-id=383 bgcolor=#E9E9E9
| 261383 ||  || — || October 27, 2005 || Kitt Peak || Spacewatch || — || align=right | 3.0 km || 
|-id=384 bgcolor=#E9E9E9
| 261384 ||  || — || October 27, 2005 || Kitt Peak || Spacewatch || — || align=right | 3.2 km || 
|-id=385 bgcolor=#d6d6d6
| 261385 ||  || — || October 30, 2005 || Mount Lemmon || Mount Lemmon Survey || — || align=right | 2.9 km || 
|-id=386 bgcolor=#E9E9E9
| 261386 ||  || — || October 26, 2005 || Kitt Peak || Spacewatch || HEN || align=right | 1.3 km || 
|-id=387 bgcolor=#d6d6d6
| 261387 ||  || — || October 26, 2005 || Kitt Peak || Spacewatch || — || align=right | 2.8 km || 
|-id=388 bgcolor=#d6d6d6
| 261388 ||  || — || October 30, 2005 || Mount Lemmon || Mount Lemmon Survey || — || align=right | 2.7 km || 
|-id=389 bgcolor=#d6d6d6
| 261389 ||  || — || October 28, 2005 || Kitt Peak || Spacewatch || — || align=right | 3.0 km || 
|-id=390 bgcolor=#E9E9E9
| 261390 ||  || — || October 29, 2005 || Mount Lemmon || Mount Lemmon Survey || — || align=right | 2.3 km || 
|-id=391 bgcolor=#fefefe
| 261391 ||  || — || October 29, 2005 || Mount Lemmon || Mount Lemmon Survey || NYS || align=right data-sort-value="0.94" | 940 m || 
|-id=392 bgcolor=#d6d6d6
| 261392 ||  || — || October 31, 2005 || Kitt Peak || Spacewatch || EUP || align=right | 5.0 km || 
|-id=393 bgcolor=#d6d6d6
| 261393 ||  || — || October 25, 2005 || Kitt Peak || Spacewatch || EOS || align=right | 2.1 km || 
|-id=394 bgcolor=#E9E9E9
| 261394 ||  || — || October 25, 2005 || Kitt Peak || Spacewatch || — || align=right | 1.6 km || 
|-id=395 bgcolor=#d6d6d6
| 261395 ||  || — || October 28, 2005 || Kitt Peak || Spacewatch || — || align=right | 2.9 km || 
|-id=396 bgcolor=#E9E9E9
| 261396 ||  || — || October 29, 2005 || Catalina || CSS || — || align=right | 3.5 km || 
|-id=397 bgcolor=#E9E9E9
| 261397 ||  || — || October 29, 2005 || Catalina || CSS || INO || align=right | 1.9 km || 
|-id=398 bgcolor=#E9E9E9
| 261398 ||  || — || October 29, 2005 || Catalina || CSS || WIT || align=right | 1.4 km || 
|-id=399 bgcolor=#fefefe
| 261399 ||  || — || October 29, 2005 || Mount Lemmon || Mount Lemmon Survey || — || align=right | 1.4 km || 
|-id=400 bgcolor=#d6d6d6
| 261400 ||  || — || October 31, 2005 || Socorro || LINEAR || — || align=right | 3.7 km || 
|}

261401–261500 

|-bgcolor=#E9E9E9
| 261401 ||  || — || October 27, 2005 || Mount Lemmon || Mount Lemmon Survey || — || align=right | 1.9 km || 
|-id=402 bgcolor=#E9E9E9
| 261402 ||  || — || October 23, 2005 || Catalina || CSS || — || align=right | 2.3 km || 
|-id=403 bgcolor=#d6d6d6
| 261403 ||  || — || October 29, 2005 || Catalina || CSS || EOS || align=right | 2.7 km || 
|-id=404 bgcolor=#d6d6d6
| 261404 ||  || — || October 31, 2005 || Mount Lemmon || Mount Lemmon Survey || KOR || align=right | 1.4 km || 
|-id=405 bgcolor=#E9E9E9
| 261405 ||  || — || October 27, 2005 || Kitt Peak || Spacewatch || — || align=right | 1.1 km || 
|-id=406 bgcolor=#E9E9E9
| 261406 ||  || — || October 30, 2005 || Kitt Peak || Spacewatch || WIT || align=right | 1.5 km || 
|-id=407 bgcolor=#d6d6d6
| 261407 ||  || — || October 24, 2005 || Kitt Peak || Spacewatch || — || align=right | 2.7 km || 
|-id=408 bgcolor=#d6d6d6
| 261408 ||  || — || October 26, 2005 || Palomar || NEAT || EUP || align=right | 4.0 km || 
|-id=409 bgcolor=#d6d6d6
| 261409 ||  || — || October 27, 2005 || Kitt Peak || Spacewatch || THM || align=right | 2.9 km || 
|-id=410 bgcolor=#E9E9E9
| 261410 ||  || — || October 27, 2005 || Anderson Mesa || LONEOS || — || align=right | 3.1 km || 
|-id=411 bgcolor=#E9E9E9
| 261411 ||  || — || October 25, 2005 || Socorro || LINEAR || JUN || align=right | 1.7 km || 
|-id=412 bgcolor=#d6d6d6
| 261412 ||  || — || October 22, 2005 || Catalina || CSS || — || align=right | 4.2 km || 
|-id=413 bgcolor=#E9E9E9
| 261413 ||  || — || October 22, 2005 || Catalina || CSS || AGN || align=right | 1.6 km || 
|-id=414 bgcolor=#E9E9E9
| 261414 ||  || — || October 22, 2005 || Catalina || CSS || — || align=right | 3.0 km || 
|-id=415 bgcolor=#E9E9E9
| 261415 ||  || — || October 23, 2005 || Catalina || CSS || — || align=right | 1.7 km || 
|-id=416 bgcolor=#E9E9E9
| 261416 ||  || — || October 23, 2005 || Catalina || CSS || — || align=right | 3.6 km || 
|-id=417 bgcolor=#d6d6d6
| 261417 ||  || — || October 23, 2005 || Catalina || CSS || — || align=right | 5.7 km || 
|-id=418 bgcolor=#E9E9E9
| 261418 ||  || — || October 23, 2005 || Catalina || CSS || — || align=right | 2.1 km || 
|-id=419 bgcolor=#d6d6d6
| 261419 ||  || — || October 25, 2005 || Catalina || CSS || CHA || align=right | 3.0 km || 
|-id=420 bgcolor=#d6d6d6
| 261420 ||  || — || October 27, 2005 || Catalina || CSS || — || align=right | 4.5 km || 
|-id=421 bgcolor=#d6d6d6
| 261421 ||  || — || October 27, 2005 || Catalina || CSS || EOS || align=right | 2.1 km || 
|-id=422 bgcolor=#E9E9E9
| 261422 ||  || — || October 25, 2005 || Kitt Peak || Spacewatch || WIT || align=right | 1.4 km || 
|-id=423 bgcolor=#E9E9E9
| 261423 ||  || — || October 26, 2005 || Anderson Mesa || LONEOS || — || align=right | 3.2 km || 
|-id=424 bgcolor=#d6d6d6
| 261424 ||  || — || October 22, 2005 || Kitt Peak || Spacewatch || KAR || align=right | 1.4 km || 
|-id=425 bgcolor=#d6d6d6
| 261425 ||  || — || October 25, 2005 || Mount Lemmon || Mount Lemmon Survey || EOS || align=right | 2.5 km || 
|-id=426 bgcolor=#d6d6d6
| 261426 ||  || — || October 20, 2005 || Apache Point || A. C. Becker || EOS || align=right | 1.9 km || 
|-id=427 bgcolor=#d6d6d6
| 261427 ||  || — || October 20, 2005 || Apache Point || A. C. Becker || KOR || align=right | 1.4 km || 
|-id=428 bgcolor=#E9E9E9
| 261428 ||  || — || October 20, 2005 || Apache Point || A. C. Becker || — || align=right | 2.5 km || 
|-id=429 bgcolor=#d6d6d6
| 261429 ||  || — || October 22, 2005 || Apache Point || A. C. Becker || — || align=right | 4.1 km || 
|-id=430 bgcolor=#d6d6d6
| 261430 ||  || — || October 25, 2005 || Mount Lemmon || Mount Lemmon Survey || — || align=right | 3.0 km || 
|-id=431 bgcolor=#E9E9E9
| 261431 ||  || — || October 27, 2005 || Apache Point || A. C. Becker || — || align=right | 1.9 km || 
|-id=432 bgcolor=#E9E9E9
| 261432 ||  || — || October 27, 2005 || Apache Point || A. C. Becker || — || align=right | 1.9 km || 
|-id=433 bgcolor=#E9E9E9
| 261433 ||  || — || October 27, 2005 || Apache Point || A. C. Becker || — || align=right | 2.3 km || 
|-id=434 bgcolor=#d6d6d6
| 261434 ||  || — || October 27, 2005 || Apache Point || A. C. Becker || — || align=right | 3.5 km || 
|-id=435 bgcolor=#d6d6d6
| 261435 ||  || — || October 30, 2005 || Mount Lemmon || Mount Lemmon Survey || — || align=right | 3.4 km || 
|-id=436 bgcolor=#d6d6d6
| 261436 ||  || — || October 25, 2005 || Mount Lemmon || Mount Lemmon Survey || — || align=right | 2.6 km || 
|-id=437 bgcolor=#d6d6d6
| 261437 ||  || — || October 28, 2005 || Kitt Peak || Spacewatch || — || align=right | 4.5 km || 
|-id=438 bgcolor=#E9E9E9
| 261438 ||  || — || November 4, 2005 || Goodricke-Pigott || R. A. Tucker || WIT || align=right | 1.6 km || 
|-id=439 bgcolor=#E9E9E9
| 261439 ||  || — || November 6, 2005 || Kitt Peak || Spacewatch || — || align=right | 3.5 km || 
|-id=440 bgcolor=#d6d6d6
| 261440 ||  || — || November 12, 2005 || Great Shefford || P. Birtwhistle || — || align=right | 2.9 km || 
|-id=441 bgcolor=#E9E9E9
| 261441 ||  || — || November 1, 2005 || Kitt Peak || Spacewatch || NEM || align=right | 2.7 km || 
|-id=442 bgcolor=#E9E9E9
| 261442 ||  || — || November 3, 2005 || Catalina || CSS || — || align=right | 1.6 km || 
|-id=443 bgcolor=#d6d6d6
| 261443 ||  || — || November 3, 2005 || Socorro || LINEAR || — || align=right | 3.3 km || 
|-id=444 bgcolor=#E9E9E9
| 261444 ||  || — || November 1, 2005 || Kitt Peak || Spacewatch || — || align=right | 3.0 km || 
|-id=445 bgcolor=#d6d6d6
| 261445 ||  || — || November 3, 2005 || Mount Lemmon || Mount Lemmon Survey || KOR || align=right | 1.4 km || 
|-id=446 bgcolor=#d6d6d6
| 261446 ||  || — || November 4, 2005 || Kitt Peak || Spacewatch || VER || align=right | 3.1 km || 
|-id=447 bgcolor=#d6d6d6
| 261447 ||  || — || November 4, 2005 || Kitt Peak || Spacewatch || — || align=right | 3.3 km || 
|-id=448 bgcolor=#d6d6d6
| 261448 ||  || — || November 4, 2005 || Kitt Peak || Spacewatch || — || align=right | 4.6 km || 
|-id=449 bgcolor=#d6d6d6
| 261449 ||  || — || November 4, 2005 || Kitt Peak || Spacewatch || — || align=right | 3.7 km || 
|-id=450 bgcolor=#d6d6d6
| 261450 ||  || — || November 4, 2005 || Catalina || CSS || — || align=right | 3.2 km || 
|-id=451 bgcolor=#d6d6d6
| 261451 ||  || — || November 4, 2005 || Mount Lemmon || Mount Lemmon Survey || — || align=right | 3.6 km || 
|-id=452 bgcolor=#E9E9E9
| 261452 ||  || — || November 3, 2005 || Kitt Peak || Spacewatch || — || align=right | 1.7 km || 
|-id=453 bgcolor=#E9E9E9
| 261453 ||  || — || November 1, 2005 || Catalina || CSS || — || align=right | 3.0 km || 
|-id=454 bgcolor=#d6d6d6
| 261454 ||  || — || November 3, 2005 || Catalina || CSS || — || align=right | 4.8 km || 
|-id=455 bgcolor=#d6d6d6
| 261455 ||  || — || November 3, 2005 || Mount Lemmon || Mount Lemmon Survey || — || align=right | 3.7 km || 
|-id=456 bgcolor=#E9E9E9
| 261456 ||  || — || November 5, 2005 || Anderson Mesa || LONEOS || — || align=right | 1.8 km || 
|-id=457 bgcolor=#d6d6d6
| 261457 ||  || — || November 1, 2005 || Mount Lemmon || Mount Lemmon Survey || 7:4 || align=right | 4.8 km || 
|-id=458 bgcolor=#d6d6d6
| 261458 ||  || — || November 1, 2005 || Mount Lemmon || Mount Lemmon Survey || — || align=right | 2.7 km || 
|-id=459 bgcolor=#E9E9E9
| 261459 ||  || — || November 1, 2005 || Mount Lemmon || Mount Lemmon Survey || — || align=right | 3.1 km || 
|-id=460 bgcolor=#E9E9E9
| 261460 ||  || — || November 1, 2005 || Mount Lemmon || Mount Lemmon Survey || — || align=right | 2.5 km || 
|-id=461 bgcolor=#E9E9E9
| 261461 ||  || — || November 1, 2005 || Mount Lemmon || Mount Lemmon Survey || — || align=right | 3.8 km || 
|-id=462 bgcolor=#d6d6d6
| 261462 ||  || — || November 1, 2005 || Mount Lemmon || Mount Lemmon Survey || EOS || align=right | 2.6 km || 
|-id=463 bgcolor=#fefefe
| 261463 ||  || — || November 4, 2005 || Catalina || CSS || H || align=right data-sort-value="0.87" | 870 m || 
|-id=464 bgcolor=#d6d6d6
| 261464 ||  || — || November 5, 2005 || Kitt Peak || Spacewatch || VER || align=right | 4.0 km || 
|-id=465 bgcolor=#E9E9E9
| 261465 ||  || — || November 9, 2005 || Catalina || CSS || — || align=right | 2.8 km || 
|-id=466 bgcolor=#E9E9E9
| 261466 ||  || — || November 6, 2005 || Mount Lemmon || Mount Lemmon Survey || AGN || align=right | 1.5 km || 
|-id=467 bgcolor=#d6d6d6
| 261467 ||  || — || November 6, 2005 || Mount Lemmon || Mount Lemmon Survey || — || align=right | 3.1 km || 
|-id=468 bgcolor=#E9E9E9
| 261468 ||  || — || November 1, 2005 || Anderson Mesa || LONEOS || — || align=right | 2.7 km || 
|-id=469 bgcolor=#d6d6d6
| 261469 ||  || — || November 6, 2005 || Kitt Peak || Spacewatch || TEL || align=right | 1.4 km || 
|-id=470 bgcolor=#E9E9E9
| 261470 ||  || — || November 6, 2005 || Mount Lemmon || Mount Lemmon Survey || — || align=right | 1.5 km || 
|-id=471 bgcolor=#d6d6d6
| 261471 ||  || — || November 6, 2005 || Mount Lemmon || Mount Lemmon Survey || EOS || align=right | 3.7 km || 
|-id=472 bgcolor=#d6d6d6
| 261472 ||  || — || November 10, 2005 || Catalina || CSS || — || align=right | 3.0 km || 
|-id=473 bgcolor=#d6d6d6
| 261473 ||  || — || November 10, 2005 || Campo Imperatore || CINEOS || — || align=right | 3.5 km || 
|-id=474 bgcolor=#E9E9E9
| 261474 ||  || — || November 11, 2005 || Kitt Peak || Spacewatch || — || align=right | 2.1 km || 
|-id=475 bgcolor=#d6d6d6
| 261475 ||  || — || August 15, 2004 || Siding Spring || SSS || EUP || align=right | 5.9 km || 
|-id=476 bgcolor=#d6d6d6
| 261476 ||  || — || November 12, 2005 || Catalina || CSS || — || align=right | 4.4 km || 
|-id=477 bgcolor=#d6d6d6
| 261477 ||  || — || November 4, 2005 || Kitt Peak || Spacewatch || — || align=right | 4.5 km || 
|-id=478 bgcolor=#d6d6d6
| 261478 ||  || — || November 12, 2005 || Catalina || CSS || — || align=right | 2.8 km || 
|-id=479 bgcolor=#d6d6d6
| 261479 ||  || — || November 6, 2005 || Anderson Mesa || LONEOS || — || align=right | 4.5 km || 
|-id=480 bgcolor=#d6d6d6
| 261480 ||  || — || November 6, 2005 || Mount Lemmon || Mount Lemmon Survey || — || align=right | 3.2 km || 
|-id=481 bgcolor=#d6d6d6
| 261481 ||  || — || November 3, 2005 || Catalina || CSS || — || align=right | 3.4 km || 
|-id=482 bgcolor=#d6d6d6
| 261482 ||  || — || November 6, 2005 || Mount Lemmon || Mount Lemmon Survey || — || align=right | 4.5 km || 
|-id=483 bgcolor=#d6d6d6
| 261483 ||  || — || November 1, 2005 || Apache Point || A. C. Becker || URS || align=right | 4.7 km || 
|-id=484 bgcolor=#d6d6d6
| 261484 ||  || — || November 1, 2005 || Apache Point || A. C. Becker || — || align=right | 2.9 km || 
|-id=485 bgcolor=#d6d6d6
| 261485 ||  || — || November 1, 2005 || Apache Point || A. C. Becker || — || align=right | 4.4 km || 
|-id=486 bgcolor=#d6d6d6
| 261486 ||  || — || November 1, 2005 || Mount Lemmon || Mount Lemmon Survey || CHA || align=right | 2.4 km || 
|-id=487 bgcolor=#E9E9E9
| 261487 ||  || — || November 1, 2005 || Kitt Peak || Spacewatch || — || align=right | 2.6 km || 
|-id=488 bgcolor=#d6d6d6
| 261488 ||  || — || November 21, 2005 || Socorro || LINEAR || EUP || align=right | 6.7 km || 
|-id=489 bgcolor=#d6d6d6
| 261489 ||  || — || November 17, 2005 || Palomar || NEAT || — || align=right | 3.2 km || 
|-id=490 bgcolor=#d6d6d6
| 261490 ||  || — || November 21, 2005 || Anderson Mesa || LONEOS || — || align=right | 5.8 km || 
|-id=491 bgcolor=#d6d6d6
| 261491 ||  || — || November 21, 2005 || Catalina || CSS || — || align=right | 2.8 km || 
|-id=492 bgcolor=#d6d6d6
| 261492 ||  || — || November 21, 2005 || Catalina || CSS || — || align=right | 6.0 km || 
|-id=493 bgcolor=#d6d6d6
| 261493 ||  || — || November 22, 2005 || Kitt Peak || Spacewatch || HYG || align=right | 2.9 km || 
|-id=494 bgcolor=#d6d6d6
| 261494 ||  || — || November 22, 2005 || Kitt Peak || Spacewatch || — || align=right | 3.4 km || 
|-id=495 bgcolor=#d6d6d6
| 261495 ||  || — || November 22, 2005 || Kitt Peak || Spacewatch || — || align=right | 2.4 km || 
|-id=496 bgcolor=#d6d6d6
| 261496 ||  || — || November 22, 2005 || Kitt Peak || Spacewatch || — || align=right | 3.1 km || 
|-id=497 bgcolor=#d6d6d6
| 261497 ||  || — || November 22, 2005 || Kitt Peak || Spacewatch || HYG || align=right | 3.2 km || 
|-id=498 bgcolor=#E9E9E9
| 261498 ||  || — || November 21, 2005 || Kitt Peak || Spacewatch || — || align=right | 2.6 km || 
|-id=499 bgcolor=#d6d6d6
| 261499 ||  || — || November 21, 2005 || Kitt Peak || Spacewatch || EOS || align=right | 2.5 km || 
|-id=500 bgcolor=#d6d6d6
| 261500 ||  || — || November 21, 2005 || Kitt Peak || Spacewatch || EOS || align=right | 2.9 km || 
|}

261501–261600 

|-bgcolor=#d6d6d6
| 261501 ||  || — || November 21, 2005 || Kitt Peak || Spacewatch || — || align=right | 2.8 km || 
|-id=502 bgcolor=#d6d6d6
| 261502 ||  || — || November 21, 2005 || Kitt Peak || Spacewatch || — || align=right | 3.7 km || 
|-id=503 bgcolor=#d6d6d6
| 261503 ||  || — || November 21, 2005 || Kitt Peak || Spacewatch || — || align=right | 3.2 km || 
|-id=504 bgcolor=#d6d6d6
| 261504 ||  || — || November 22, 2005 || Kitt Peak || Spacewatch || 7:4 || align=right | 6.5 km || 
|-id=505 bgcolor=#d6d6d6
| 261505 ||  || — || November 22, 2005 || Kitt Peak || Spacewatch || — || align=right | 3.1 km || 
|-id=506 bgcolor=#d6d6d6
| 261506 ||  || — || November 21, 2005 || Kitt Peak || Spacewatch || — || align=right | 2.5 km || 
|-id=507 bgcolor=#d6d6d6
| 261507 ||  || — || November 21, 2005 || Catalina || CSS || — || align=right | 2.9 km || 
|-id=508 bgcolor=#d6d6d6
| 261508 ||  || — || November 22, 2005 || Kitt Peak || Spacewatch || — || align=right | 3.2 km || 
|-id=509 bgcolor=#d6d6d6
| 261509 ||  || — || November 22, 2005 || Kitt Peak || Spacewatch || — || align=right | 5.0 km || 
|-id=510 bgcolor=#E9E9E9
| 261510 ||  || — || November 25, 2005 || Kitt Peak || Spacewatch || — || align=right | 3.5 km || 
|-id=511 bgcolor=#d6d6d6
| 261511 ||  || — || November 25, 2005 || Kitt Peak || Spacewatch || — || align=right | 3.7 km || 
|-id=512 bgcolor=#d6d6d6
| 261512 ||  || — || November 25, 2005 || Catalina || CSS || — || align=right | 2.4 km || 
|-id=513 bgcolor=#d6d6d6
| 261513 ||  || — || November 28, 2005 || Socorro || LINEAR || — || align=right | 3.3 km || 
|-id=514 bgcolor=#E9E9E9
| 261514 ||  || — || November 25, 2005 || Catalina || CSS || — || align=right | 2.3 km || 
|-id=515 bgcolor=#fefefe
| 261515 ||  || — || November 20, 2005 || Catalina || CSS || H || align=right data-sort-value="0.87" | 870 m || 
|-id=516 bgcolor=#d6d6d6
| 261516 ||  || — || November 22, 2005 || Kitt Peak || Spacewatch || EOS || align=right | 2.3 km || 
|-id=517 bgcolor=#d6d6d6
| 261517 ||  || — || November 22, 2005 || Kitt Peak || Spacewatch || — || align=right | 3.2 km || 
|-id=518 bgcolor=#E9E9E9
| 261518 ||  || — || November 25, 2005 || Mount Lemmon || Mount Lemmon Survey || — || align=right | 3.5 km || 
|-id=519 bgcolor=#d6d6d6
| 261519 ||  || — || November 26, 2005 || Kitt Peak || Spacewatch || — || align=right | 3.0 km || 
|-id=520 bgcolor=#d6d6d6
| 261520 ||  || — || November 26, 2005 || Mount Lemmon || Mount Lemmon Survey || — || align=right | 4.7 km || 
|-id=521 bgcolor=#E9E9E9
| 261521 ||  || — || November 21, 2005 || Catalina || CSS || — || align=right | 3.2 km || 
|-id=522 bgcolor=#d6d6d6
| 261522 ||  || — || November 28, 2005 || Palomar || NEAT || — || align=right | 4.0 km || 
|-id=523 bgcolor=#d6d6d6
| 261523 ||  || — || November 25, 2005 || Kitt Peak || Spacewatch || — || align=right | 2.9 km || 
|-id=524 bgcolor=#d6d6d6
| 261524 ||  || — || November 26, 2005 || Mount Lemmon || Mount Lemmon Survey || — || align=right | 2.7 km || 
|-id=525 bgcolor=#E9E9E9
| 261525 ||  || — || November 28, 2005 || Socorro || LINEAR || MRX || align=right | 1.7 km || 
|-id=526 bgcolor=#d6d6d6
| 261526 ||  || — || November 25, 2005 || Mount Lemmon || Mount Lemmon Survey || — || align=right | 3.2 km || 
|-id=527 bgcolor=#E9E9E9
| 261527 ||  || — || November 26, 2005 || Mount Lemmon || Mount Lemmon Survey || — || align=right | 3.4 km || 
|-id=528 bgcolor=#E9E9E9
| 261528 ||  || — || November 28, 2005 || Mount Lemmon || Mount Lemmon Survey || WIT || align=right | 1.7 km || 
|-id=529 bgcolor=#d6d6d6
| 261529 ||  || — || November 28, 2005 || Catalina || CSS || KOR || align=right | 1.9 km || 
|-id=530 bgcolor=#d6d6d6
| 261530 ||  || — || November 26, 2005 || Kitt Peak || Spacewatch || — || align=right | 3.0 km || 
|-id=531 bgcolor=#E9E9E9
| 261531 ||  || — || November 28, 2005 || Mount Lemmon || Mount Lemmon Survey || WIT || align=right | 1.5 km || 
|-id=532 bgcolor=#d6d6d6
| 261532 ||  || — || November 28, 2005 || Mount Lemmon || Mount Lemmon Survey || — || align=right | 2.8 km || 
|-id=533 bgcolor=#d6d6d6
| 261533 ||  || — || November 28, 2005 || Catalina || CSS || LIX || align=right | 6.7 km || 
|-id=534 bgcolor=#E9E9E9
| 261534 ||  || — || November 28, 2005 || Catalina || CSS || WIT || align=right | 1.5 km || 
|-id=535 bgcolor=#E9E9E9
| 261535 ||  || — || November 25, 2005 || Catalina || CSS || — || align=right | 2.8 km || 
|-id=536 bgcolor=#E9E9E9
| 261536 ||  || — || November 30, 2005 || Catalina || CSS || — || align=right | 2.5 km || 
|-id=537 bgcolor=#E9E9E9
| 261537 ||  || — || November 30, 2005 || Socorro || LINEAR || — || align=right | 3.5 km || 
|-id=538 bgcolor=#d6d6d6
| 261538 ||  || — || November 29, 2005 || Kitt Peak || Spacewatch || KOR || align=right | 1.7 km || 
|-id=539 bgcolor=#d6d6d6
| 261539 ||  || — || November 30, 2005 || Socorro || LINEAR || EOS || align=right | 2.9 km || 
|-id=540 bgcolor=#d6d6d6
| 261540 ||  || — || November 25, 2005 || Mount Lemmon || Mount Lemmon Survey || — || align=right | 3.2 km || 
|-id=541 bgcolor=#E9E9E9
| 261541 ||  || — || November 25, 2005 || Mount Lemmon || Mount Lemmon Survey || — || align=right | 1.4 km || 
|-id=542 bgcolor=#d6d6d6
| 261542 ||  || — || November 25, 2005 || Mount Lemmon || Mount Lemmon Survey || THM || align=right | 2.5 km || 
|-id=543 bgcolor=#d6d6d6
| 261543 ||  || — || November 25, 2005 || Mount Lemmon || Mount Lemmon Survey || CHA || align=right | 2.4 km || 
|-id=544 bgcolor=#d6d6d6
| 261544 ||  || — || November 25, 2005 || Mount Lemmon || Mount Lemmon Survey || — || align=right | 3.4 km || 
|-id=545 bgcolor=#d6d6d6
| 261545 ||  || — || November 25, 2005 || Mount Lemmon || Mount Lemmon Survey || ALA || align=right | 4.8 km || 
|-id=546 bgcolor=#d6d6d6
| 261546 ||  || — || November 26, 2005 || Kitt Peak || Spacewatch || — || align=right | 3.3 km || 
|-id=547 bgcolor=#d6d6d6
| 261547 ||  || — || November 26, 2005 || Mount Lemmon || Mount Lemmon Survey || — || align=right | 2.9 km || 
|-id=548 bgcolor=#d6d6d6
| 261548 ||  || — || November 28, 2005 || Mount Lemmon || Mount Lemmon Survey || — || align=right | 3.3 km || 
|-id=549 bgcolor=#d6d6d6
| 261549 ||  || — || November 29, 2005 || Mount Lemmon || Mount Lemmon Survey || KOR || align=right | 2.3 km || 
|-id=550 bgcolor=#E9E9E9
| 261550 ||  || — || November 26, 2005 || Catalina || CSS || — || align=right | 3.3 km || 
|-id=551 bgcolor=#d6d6d6
| 261551 ||  || — || November 28, 2005 || Kitt Peak || Spacewatch || EOS || align=right | 2.2 km || 
|-id=552 bgcolor=#d6d6d6
| 261552 ||  || — || November 28, 2005 || Socorro || LINEAR || EOS || align=right | 2.9 km || 
|-id=553 bgcolor=#E9E9E9
| 261553 ||  || — || November 29, 2005 || Palomar || NEAT || — || align=right | 4.4 km || 
|-id=554 bgcolor=#d6d6d6
| 261554 ||  || — || November 29, 2005 || Kitt Peak || Spacewatch || THM || align=right | 2.2 km || 
|-id=555 bgcolor=#d6d6d6
| 261555 ||  || — || November 29, 2005 || Kitt Peak || Spacewatch || — || align=right | 2.4 km || 
|-id=556 bgcolor=#d6d6d6
| 261556 ||  || — || November 29, 2005 || Socorro || LINEAR || CHA || align=right | 2.9 km || 
|-id=557 bgcolor=#d6d6d6
| 261557 ||  || — || November 30, 2005 || Kitt Peak || Spacewatch || — || align=right | 3.6 km || 
|-id=558 bgcolor=#d6d6d6
| 261558 ||  || — || November 28, 2005 || Kitt Peak || Spacewatch || — || align=right | 2.9 km || 
|-id=559 bgcolor=#d6d6d6
| 261559 ||  || — || November 29, 2005 || Mount Lemmon || Mount Lemmon Survey || — || align=right | 3.0 km || 
|-id=560 bgcolor=#E9E9E9
| 261560 ||  || — || November 29, 2005 || Mount Lemmon || Mount Lemmon Survey || — || align=right | 2.4 km || 
|-id=561 bgcolor=#E9E9E9
| 261561 ||  || — || November 30, 2005 || Kitt Peak || Spacewatch || HOF || align=right | 3.4 km || 
|-id=562 bgcolor=#d6d6d6
| 261562 ||  || — || November 30, 2005 || Kitt Peak || Spacewatch || — || align=right | 3.5 km || 
|-id=563 bgcolor=#d6d6d6
| 261563 ||  || — || November 30, 2005 || Kitt Peak || Spacewatch || — || align=right | 3.3 km || 
|-id=564 bgcolor=#d6d6d6
| 261564 ||  || — || November 30, 2005 || Kitt Peak || Spacewatch || EOS || align=right | 2.4 km || 
|-id=565 bgcolor=#d6d6d6
| 261565 ||  || — || November 30, 2005 || Mount Lemmon || Mount Lemmon Survey || NAE || align=right | 2.7 km || 
|-id=566 bgcolor=#d6d6d6
| 261566 ||  || — || November 30, 2005 || Kitt Peak || Spacewatch || — || align=right | 2.9 km || 
|-id=567 bgcolor=#d6d6d6
| 261567 ||  || — || November 30, 2005 || Kitt Peak || Spacewatch || — || align=right | 2.5 km || 
|-id=568 bgcolor=#d6d6d6
| 261568 ||  || — || November 30, 2005 || Kitt Peak || Spacewatch || — || align=right | 4.8 km || 
|-id=569 bgcolor=#d6d6d6
| 261569 ||  || — || November 21, 2005 || Anderson Mesa || LONEOS || — || align=right | 3.0 km || 
|-id=570 bgcolor=#d6d6d6
| 261570 ||  || — || November 29, 2005 || Kitt Peak || Spacewatch || — || align=right | 2.9 km || 
|-id=571 bgcolor=#d6d6d6
| 261571 ||  || — || November 30, 2005 || Kitt Peak || Spacewatch || — || align=right | 2.9 km || 
|-id=572 bgcolor=#d6d6d6
| 261572 ||  || — || November 20, 2005 || Catalina || CSS || — || align=right | 4.2 km || 
|-id=573 bgcolor=#E9E9E9
| 261573 ||  || — || November 21, 2005 || Catalina || CSS || — || align=right | 3.4 km || 
|-id=574 bgcolor=#d6d6d6
| 261574 ||  || — || November 22, 2005 || Catalina || CSS || TIR || align=right | 3.6 km || 
|-id=575 bgcolor=#E9E9E9
| 261575 ||  || — || November 25, 2005 || Kitt Peak || Spacewatch || — || align=right | 1.9 km || 
|-id=576 bgcolor=#d6d6d6
| 261576 ||  || — || November 25, 2005 || Kitt Peak || Spacewatch || — || align=right | 3.2 km || 
|-id=577 bgcolor=#E9E9E9
| 261577 ||  || — || November 21, 2005 || Catalina || CSS || HNS || align=right | 1.9 km || 
|-id=578 bgcolor=#d6d6d6
| 261578 ||  || — || November 22, 2005 || Kitt Peak || Spacewatch || — || align=right | 4.3 km || 
|-id=579 bgcolor=#E9E9E9
| 261579 ||  || — || December 1, 2005 || Mount Lemmon || Mount Lemmon Survey || PAD || align=right | 2.3 km || 
|-id=580 bgcolor=#d6d6d6
| 261580 ||  || — || December 2, 2005 || Mount Lemmon || Mount Lemmon Survey || KOR || align=right | 2.1 km || 
|-id=581 bgcolor=#d6d6d6
| 261581 ||  || — || December 6, 2005 || Gnosca || S. Sposetti || — || align=right | 2.5 km || 
|-id=582 bgcolor=#d6d6d6
| 261582 ||  || — || December 6, 2005 || Gnosca || S. Sposetti || — || align=right | 3.5 km || 
|-id=583 bgcolor=#d6d6d6
| 261583 ||  || — || December 1, 2005 || Mount Lemmon || Mount Lemmon Survey || — || align=right | 3.4 km || 
|-id=584 bgcolor=#E9E9E9
| 261584 ||  || — || December 1, 2005 || Kitt Peak || Spacewatch || — || align=right | 3.7 km || 
|-id=585 bgcolor=#E9E9E9
| 261585 ||  || — || December 1, 2005 || Kitt Peak || Spacewatch || — || align=right | 2.8 km || 
|-id=586 bgcolor=#d6d6d6
| 261586 ||  || — || December 2, 2005 || Kitt Peak || Spacewatch || — || align=right | 4.1 km || 
|-id=587 bgcolor=#d6d6d6
| 261587 ||  || — || December 2, 2005 || Socorro || LINEAR || — || align=right | 4.3 km || 
|-id=588 bgcolor=#d6d6d6
| 261588 ||  || — || December 2, 2005 || Socorro || LINEAR || — || align=right | 4.5 km || 
|-id=589 bgcolor=#E9E9E9
| 261589 ||  || — || December 4, 2005 || Socorro || LINEAR || PAD || align=right | 2.3 km || 
|-id=590 bgcolor=#d6d6d6
| 261590 ||  || — || December 1, 2005 || Anderson Mesa || LONEOS || — || align=right | 2.0 km || 
|-id=591 bgcolor=#fefefe
| 261591 ||  || — || December 1, 2005 || Palomar || NEAT || H || align=right data-sort-value="0.78" | 780 m || 
|-id=592 bgcolor=#d6d6d6
| 261592 ||  || — || December 1, 2005 || Catalina || CSS || CHA || align=right | 2.9 km || 
|-id=593 bgcolor=#E9E9E9
| 261593 ||  || — || December 4, 2005 || Kitt Peak || Spacewatch || AGN || align=right | 1.4 km || 
|-id=594 bgcolor=#d6d6d6
| 261594 ||  || — || December 2, 2005 || Kitt Peak || Spacewatch || — || align=right | 3.5 km || 
|-id=595 bgcolor=#d6d6d6
| 261595 ||  || — || December 2, 2005 || Kitt Peak || Spacewatch || — || align=right | 3.5 km || 
|-id=596 bgcolor=#d6d6d6
| 261596 ||  || — || December 2, 2005 || Kitt Peak || Spacewatch || — || align=right | 3.4 km || 
|-id=597 bgcolor=#E9E9E9
| 261597 ||  || — || December 4, 2005 || Kitt Peak || Spacewatch || — || align=right | 2.0 km || 
|-id=598 bgcolor=#fefefe
| 261598 ||  || — || December 5, 2005 || Catalina || CSS || H || align=right | 1.0 km || 
|-id=599 bgcolor=#d6d6d6
| 261599 ||  || — || December 1, 2005 || Mount Lemmon || Mount Lemmon Survey || — || align=right | 2.9 km || 
|-id=600 bgcolor=#E9E9E9
| 261600 ||  || — || December 3, 2005 || Kitt Peak || Spacewatch || — || align=right | 2.5 km || 
|}

261601–261700 

|-bgcolor=#E9E9E9
| 261601 ||  || — || December 3, 2005 || Kitt Peak || Spacewatch || — || align=right | 3.0 km || 
|-id=602 bgcolor=#d6d6d6
| 261602 ||  || — || December 5, 2005 || Mount Lemmon || Mount Lemmon Survey || KOR || align=right | 1.7 km || 
|-id=603 bgcolor=#fefefe
| 261603 ||  || — || December 5, 2005 || Catalina || CSS || H || align=right data-sort-value="0.87" | 870 m || 
|-id=604 bgcolor=#d6d6d6
| 261604 ||  || — || December 6, 2005 || Kitt Peak || Spacewatch || — || align=right | 3.2 km || 
|-id=605 bgcolor=#d6d6d6
| 261605 ||  || — || December 10, 2005 || Kitt Peak || Spacewatch || — || align=right | 2.5 km || 
|-id=606 bgcolor=#d6d6d6
| 261606 ||  || — || December 5, 2005 || Socorro || LINEAR || EOS || align=right | 2.9 km || 
|-id=607 bgcolor=#d6d6d6
| 261607 ||  || — || December 10, 2005 || Kitt Peak || Spacewatch || — || align=right | 3.6 km || 
|-id=608 bgcolor=#d6d6d6
| 261608 ||  || — || December 1, 2005 || Kitt Peak || M. W. Buie || — || align=right | 3.2 km || 
|-id=609 bgcolor=#d6d6d6
| 261609 ||  || — || December 2, 2005 || Kitt Peak || M. W. Buie || EOS || align=right | 2.9 km || 
|-id=610 bgcolor=#d6d6d6
| 261610 ||  || — || December 7, 2005 || Catalina || CSS || Tj (2.95) || align=right | 5.3 km || 
|-id=611 bgcolor=#d6d6d6
| 261611 ||  || — || December 1, 2005 || Mount Lemmon || Mount Lemmon Survey || — || align=right | 2.9 km || 
|-id=612 bgcolor=#d6d6d6
| 261612 ||  || — || December 1, 2005 || Mount Lemmon || Mount Lemmon Survey || — || align=right | 4.0 km || 
|-id=613 bgcolor=#d6d6d6
| 261613 ||  || — || December 7, 2005 || Kitt Peak || Spacewatch || — || align=right | 4.5 km || 
|-id=614 bgcolor=#d6d6d6
| 261614 ||  || — || December 5, 2005 || Catalina || CSS || — || align=right | 5.7 km || 
|-id=615 bgcolor=#d6d6d6
| 261615 ||  || — || December 21, 2005 || Kitt Peak || Spacewatch || — || align=right | 3.5 km || 
|-id=616 bgcolor=#E9E9E9
| 261616 ||  || — || December 21, 2005 || Kitt Peak || Spacewatch || AGN || align=right | 1.5 km || 
|-id=617 bgcolor=#d6d6d6
| 261617 ||  || — || December 22, 2005 || Kitt Peak || Spacewatch || — || align=right | 3.5 km || 
|-id=618 bgcolor=#d6d6d6
| 261618 ||  || — || December 22, 2005 || Kitt Peak || Spacewatch || VER || align=right | 3.8 km || 
|-id=619 bgcolor=#d6d6d6
| 261619 ||  || — || December 22, 2005 || Kitt Peak || Spacewatch || THM || align=right | 2.7 km || 
|-id=620 bgcolor=#d6d6d6
| 261620 ||  || — || December 23, 2005 || Kitt Peak || Spacewatch || KAR || align=right | 1.2 km || 
|-id=621 bgcolor=#d6d6d6
| 261621 ||  || — || December 24, 2005 || Kitt Peak || Spacewatch || THM || align=right | 2.1 km || 
|-id=622 bgcolor=#d6d6d6
| 261622 ||  || — || December 24, 2005 || Kitt Peak || Spacewatch || — || align=right | 4.0 km || 
|-id=623 bgcolor=#d6d6d6
| 261623 ||  || — || December 24, 2005 || Kitt Peak || Spacewatch || THM || align=right | 2.5 km || 
|-id=624 bgcolor=#d6d6d6
| 261624 ||  || — || December 24, 2005 || Kitt Peak || Spacewatch || — || align=right | 5.1 km || 
|-id=625 bgcolor=#d6d6d6
| 261625 ||  || — || December 24, 2005 || Kitt Peak || Spacewatch || KAR || align=right | 1.5 km || 
|-id=626 bgcolor=#d6d6d6
| 261626 ||  || — || December 22, 2005 || Kitt Peak || Spacewatch || HYG || align=right | 3.3 km || 
|-id=627 bgcolor=#d6d6d6
| 261627 ||  || — || December 22, 2005 || Kitt Peak || Spacewatch || — || align=right | 4.2 km || 
|-id=628 bgcolor=#d6d6d6
| 261628 ||  || — || December 24, 2005 || Kitt Peak || Spacewatch || — || align=right | 3.7 km || 
|-id=629 bgcolor=#d6d6d6
| 261629 ||  || — || December 24, 2005 || Kitt Peak || Spacewatch || — || align=right | 5.0 km || 
|-id=630 bgcolor=#d6d6d6
| 261630 ||  || — || December 25, 2005 || Kitt Peak || Spacewatch || THM || align=right | 2.7 km || 
|-id=631 bgcolor=#d6d6d6
| 261631 ||  || — || December 21, 2005 || Catalina || CSS || — || align=right | 4.8 km || 
|-id=632 bgcolor=#d6d6d6
| 261632 ||  || — || December 21, 2005 || Catalina || CSS || DUR || align=right | 5.8 km || 
|-id=633 bgcolor=#d6d6d6
| 261633 ||  || — || December 22, 2005 || Catalina || CSS || — || align=right | 4.5 km || 
|-id=634 bgcolor=#E9E9E9
| 261634 ||  || — || December 21, 2005 || Kitt Peak || Spacewatch || — || align=right | 3.5 km || 
|-id=635 bgcolor=#d6d6d6
| 261635 ||  || — || December 22, 2005 || Kitt Peak || Spacewatch || — || align=right | 4.1 km || 
|-id=636 bgcolor=#d6d6d6
| 261636 ||  || — || December 22, 2005 || Kitt Peak || Spacewatch || — || align=right | 2.7 km || 
|-id=637 bgcolor=#d6d6d6
| 261637 ||  || — || December 26, 2005 || Mount Lemmon || Mount Lemmon Survey || KOR || align=right | 1.9 km || 
|-id=638 bgcolor=#d6d6d6
| 261638 ||  || — || December 22, 2005 || Kitt Peak || Spacewatch || KOR || align=right | 1.8 km || 
|-id=639 bgcolor=#d6d6d6
| 261639 ||  || — || December 25, 2005 || Kitt Peak || Spacewatch || — || align=right | 4.0 km || 
|-id=640 bgcolor=#d6d6d6
| 261640 ||  || — || December 25, 2005 || Mount Lemmon || Mount Lemmon Survey || — || align=right | 5.8 km || 
|-id=641 bgcolor=#d6d6d6
| 261641 ||  || — || December 26, 2005 || Kitt Peak || Spacewatch || — || align=right | 3.4 km || 
|-id=642 bgcolor=#d6d6d6
| 261642 ||  || — || December 26, 2005 || Kitt Peak || Spacewatch || — || align=right | 3.8 km || 
|-id=643 bgcolor=#d6d6d6
| 261643 ||  || — || December 24, 2005 || Kitt Peak || Spacewatch || THM || align=right | 2.4 km || 
|-id=644 bgcolor=#d6d6d6
| 261644 ||  || — || December 24, 2005 || Kitt Peak || Spacewatch || — || align=right | 3.7 km || 
|-id=645 bgcolor=#d6d6d6
| 261645 ||  || — || December 24, 2005 || Kitt Peak || Spacewatch || — || align=right | 3.4 km || 
|-id=646 bgcolor=#d6d6d6
| 261646 ||  || — || December 24, 2005 || Kitt Peak || Spacewatch || — || align=right | 3.1 km || 
|-id=647 bgcolor=#d6d6d6
| 261647 ||  || — || December 26, 2005 || Mount Lemmon || Mount Lemmon Survey || — || align=right | 3.2 km || 
|-id=648 bgcolor=#d6d6d6
| 261648 ||  || — || December 27, 2005 || Mount Lemmon || Mount Lemmon Survey || — || align=right | 3.2 km || 
|-id=649 bgcolor=#fefefe
| 261649 ||  || — || December 24, 2005 || Kitt Peak || Spacewatch || H || align=right | 1.1 km || 
|-id=650 bgcolor=#fefefe
| 261650 ||  || — || December 24, 2005 || Kitt Peak || Spacewatch || H || align=right data-sort-value="0.71" | 710 m || 
|-id=651 bgcolor=#d6d6d6
| 261651 ||  || — || December 25, 2005 || Kitt Peak || Spacewatch || — || align=right | 2.9 km || 
|-id=652 bgcolor=#d6d6d6
| 261652 ||  || — || December 24, 2005 || Kitt Peak || Spacewatch || EOS || align=right | 2.9 km || 
|-id=653 bgcolor=#d6d6d6
| 261653 ||  || — || December 24, 2005 || Kitt Peak || Spacewatch || — || align=right | 3.2 km || 
|-id=654 bgcolor=#d6d6d6
| 261654 ||  || — || December 28, 2005 || Kitt Peak || Spacewatch || — || align=right | 4.0 km || 
|-id=655 bgcolor=#d6d6d6
| 261655 ||  || — || December 25, 2005 || Kitt Peak || Spacewatch || — || align=right | 2.8 km || 
|-id=656 bgcolor=#d6d6d6
| 261656 ||  || — || December 25, 2005 || Kitt Peak || Spacewatch || 628 || align=right | 2.5 km || 
|-id=657 bgcolor=#d6d6d6
| 261657 ||  || — || December 25, 2005 || Mount Lemmon || Mount Lemmon Survey || TRP || align=right | 3.2 km || 
|-id=658 bgcolor=#d6d6d6
| 261658 ||  || — || December 25, 2005 || Kitt Peak || Spacewatch || — || align=right | 3.1 km || 
|-id=659 bgcolor=#d6d6d6
| 261659 ||  || — || December 25, 2005 || Kitt Peak || Spacewatch || KOR || align=right | 1.3 km || 
|-id=660 bgcolor=#d6d6d6
| 261660 ||  || — || December 25, 2005 || Kitt Peak || Spacewatch || — || align=right | 3.1 km || 
|-id=661 bgcolor=#d6d6d6
| 261661 ||  || — || December 25, 2005 || Kitt Peak || Spacewatch || — || align=right | 5.0 km || 
|-id=662 bgcolor=#E9E9E9
| 261662 ||  || — || December 24, 2005 || Socorro || LINEAR || — || align=right | 3.6 km || 
|-id=663 bgcolor=#d6d6d6
| 261663 ||  || — || December 26, 2005 || Kitt Peak || Spacewatch || — || align=right | 2.8 km || 
|-id=664 bgcolor=#d6d6d6
| 261664 ||  || — || December 25, 2005 || Mount Lemmon || Mount Lemmon Survey || THM || align=right | 2.6 km || 
|-id=665 bgcolor=#d6d6d6
| 261665 ||  || — || December 25, 2005 || Mount Lemmon || Mount Lemmon Survey || THM || align=right | 2.7 km || 
|-id=666 bgcolor=#d6d6d6
| 261666 ||  || — || December 26, 2005 || Kitt Peak || Spacewatch || HYG || align=right | 3.6 km || 
|-id=667 bgcolor=#d6d6d6
| 261667 ||  || — || December 28, 2005 || Kitt Peak || Spacewatch || EOS || align=right | 3.1 km || 
|-id=668 bgcolor=#d6d6d6
| 261668 ||  || — || December 25, 2005 || Kitt Peak || Spacewatch || EUP || align=right | 6.0 km || 
|-id=669 bgcolor=#d6d6d6
| 261669 ||  || — || December 25, 2005 || Mount Lemmon || Mount Lemmon Survey || EOS || align=right | 3.1 km || 
|-id=670 bgcolor=#d6d6d6
| 261670 ||  || — || December 27, 2005 || Kitt Peak || Spacewatch || — || align=right | 5.2 km || 
|-id=671 bgcolor=#d6d6d6
| 261671 ||  || — || December 27, 2005 || Mount Lemmon || Mount Lemmon Survey || — || align=right | 5.2 km || 
|-id=672 bgcolor=#d6d6d6
| 261672 ||  || — || December 27, 2005 || Kitt Peak || Spacewatch || 7:4 || align=right | 5.3 km || 
|-id=673 bgcolor=#d6d6d6
| 261673 ||  || — || December 29, 2005 || Kitt Peak || Spacewatch || — || align=right | 3.1 km || 
|-id=674 bgcolor=#d6d6d6
| 261674 ||  || — || December 29, 2005 || Kitt Peak || Spacewatch || — || align=right | 4.1 km || 
|-id=675 bgcolor=#d6d6d6
| 261675 ||  || — || December 25, 2005 || Catalina || CSS || — || align=right | 6.0 km || 
|-id=676 bgcolor=#d6d6d6
| 261676 ||  || — || December 27, 2005 || Kitt Peak || Spacewatch || — || align=right | 3.6 km || 
|-id=677 bgcolor=#d6d6d6
| 261677 ||  || — || December 25, 2005 || Catalina || CSS || TIR || align=right | 4.8 km || 
|-id=678 bgcolor=#d6d6d6
| 261678 ||  || — || December 30, 2005 || Kitt Peak || Spacewatch || — || align=right | 3.0 km || 
|-id=679 bgcolor=#d6d6d6
| 261679 ||  || — || December 29, 2005 || Catalina || CSS || — || align=right | 6.1 km || 
|-id=680 bgcolor=#d6d6d6
| 261680 ||  || — || December 28, 2005 || Kitt Peak || Spacewatch || — || align=right | 2.8 km || 
|-id=681 bgcolor=#d6d6d6
| 261681 ||  || — || December 28, 2005 || Mount Lemmon || Mount Lemmon Survey || — || align=right | 2.9 km || 
|-id=682 bgcolor=#d6d6d6
| 261682 ||  || — || December 30, 2005 || Kitt Peak || Spacewatch || — || align=right | 3.2 km || 
|-id=683 bgcolor=#d6d6d6
| 261683 ||  || — || December 31, 2005 || Kitt Peak || Spacewatch || — || align=right | 3.6 km || 
|-id=684 bgcolor=#d6d6d6
| 261684 ||  || — || December 24, 2005 || Kitt Peak || Spacewatch || KOR || align=right | 1.7 km || 
|-id=685 bgcolor=#d6d6d6
| 261685 ||  || — || December 24, 2005 || Kitt Peak || Spacewatch || — || align=right | 3.1 km || 
|-id=686 bgcolor=#d6d6d6
| 261686 ||  || — || December 27, 2005 || Mount Lemmon || Mount Lemmon Survey || — || align=right | 4.8 km || 
|-id=687 bgcolor=#d6d6d6
| 261687 ||  || — || December 30, 2005 || Kitt Peak || Spacewatch || — || align=right | 3.1 km || 
|-id=688 bgcolor=#d6d6d6
| 261688 ||  || — || December 22, 2005 || Catalina || CSS || — || align=right | 3.9 km || 
|-id=689 bgcolor=#d6d6d6
| 261689 ||  || — || December 23, 2005 || Socorro || LINEAR || — || align=right | 3.4 km || 
|-id=690 bgcolor=#d6d6d6
| 261690 Jodorowsky ||  ||  || December 24, 2005 || Nogales || J.-C. Merlin || — || align=right | 4.4 km || 
|-id=691 bgcolor=#d6d6d6
| 261691 ||  || — || December 28, 2005 || Catalina || CSS || LUT || align=right | 5.2 km || 
|-id=692 bgcolor=#d6d6d6
| 261692 ||  || — || December 29, 2005 || Catalina || CSS || — || align=right | 5.7 km || 
|-id=693 bgcolor=#d6d6d6
| 261693 ||  || — || December 29, 2005 || Socorro || LINEAR || — || align=right | 4.1 km || 
|-id=694 bgcolor=#d6d6d6
| 261694 ||  || — || December 31, 2005 || Socorro || LINEAR || URS || align=right | 5.7 km || 
|-id=695 bgcolor=#fefefe
| 261695 ||  || — || December 30, 2005 || Catalina || CSS || H || align=right data-sort-value="0.74" | 740 m || 
|-id=696 bgcolor=#d6d6d6
| 261696 ||  || — || December 25, 2005 || Anderson Mesa || LONEOS || 7:4* || align=right | 2.7 km || 
|-id=697 bgcolor=#d6d6d6
| 261697 ||  || — || December 21, 2005 || Kitt Peak || Spacewatch || — || align=right | 2.6 km || 
|-id=698 bgcolor=#d6d6d6
| 261698 ||  || — || December 25, 2005 || Mount Lemmon || Mount Lemmon Survey || — || align=right | 4.7 km || 
|-id=699 bgcolor=#d6d6d6
| 261699 ||  || — || December 25, 2005 || Kitt Peak || Spacewatch || — || align=right | 4.3 km || 
|-id=700 bgcolor=#d6d6d6
| 261700 ||  || — || December 28, 2005 || Kitt Peak || Spacewatch || EOS || align=right | 2.4 km || 
|}

261701–261800 

|-bgcolor=#d6d6d6
| 261701 ||  || — || December 29, 2005 || Kitt Peak || Spacewatch || — || align=right | 3.7 km || 
|-id=702 bgcolor=#d6d6d6
| 261702 ||  || — || December 29, 2005 || Kitt Peak || Spacewatch || — || align=right | 3.4 km || 
|-id=703 bgcolor=#d6d6d6
| 261703 ||  || — || December 25, 2005 || Kitt Peak || Spacewatch || KOR || align=right | 1.8 km || 
|-id=704 bgcolor=#d6d6d6
| 261704 ||  || — || December 26, 2005 || Mount Lemmon || Mount Lemmon Survey || — || align=right | 5.1 km || 
|-id=705 bgcolor=#d6d6d6
| 261705 ||  || — || December 27, 2005 || Mount Lemmon || Mount Lemmon Survey || HYG || align=right | 3.8 km || 
|-id=706 bgcolor=#E9E9E9
| 261706 ||  || — || December 30, 2005 || Mount Lemmon || Mount Lemmon Survey || GEF || align=right | 1.6 km || 
|-id=707 bgcolor=#d6d6d6
| 261707 ||  || — || December 27, 2005 || Catalina || CSS || — || align=right | 4.9 km || 
|-id=708 bgcolor=#d6d6d6
| 261708 ||  || — || January 2, 2006 || Mount Lemmon || Mount Lemmon Survey || HYG || align=right | 3.1 km || 
|-id=709 bgcolor=#d6d6d6
| 261709 ||  || — || January 6, 2006 || Mayhill || iTelescope Obs. || VER || align=right | 4.9 km || 
|-id=710 bgcolor=#fefefe
| 261710 ||  || — || January 7, 2006 || Anderson Mesa || LONEOS || H || align=right data-sort-value="0.96" | 960 m || 
|-id=711 bgcolor=#d6d6d6
| 261711 ||  || — || January 2, 2006 || Mount Lemmon || Mount Lemmon Survey || — || align=right | 4.8 km || 
|-id=712 bgcolor=#d6d6d6
| 261712 ||  || — || January 2, 2006 || Socorro || LINEAR || — || align=right | 4.3 km || 
|-id=713 bgcolor=#d6d6d6
| 261713 ||  || — || January 4, 2006 || Catalina || CSS || — || align=right | 5.0 km || 
|-id=714 bgcolor=#FA8072
| 261714 ||  || — || January 5, 2006 || Catalina || CSS || H || align=right | 1.1 km || 
|-id=715 bgcolor=#d6d6d6
| 261715 ||  || — || January 4, 2006 || Kitt Peak || Spacewatch || KOR || align=right | 1.8 km || 
|-id=716 bgcolor=#d6d6d6
| 261716 ||  || — || January 1, 2006 || Catalina || CSS || — || align=right | 4.8 km || 
|-id=717 bgcolor=#d6d6d6
| 261717 ||  || — || January 5, 2006 || Kitt Peak || Spacewatch || — || align=right | 4.4 km || 
|-id=718 bgcolor=#fefefe
| 261718 ||  || — || January 5, 2006 || Catalina || CSS || H || align=right data-sort-value="0.93" | 930 m || 
|-id=719 bgcolor=#d6d6d6
| 261719 ||  || — || January 4, 2006 || Kitt Peak || Spacewatch || KOR || align=right | 2.2 km || 
|-id=720 bgcolor=#d6d6d6
| 261720 ||  || — || January 5, 2006 || Kitt Peak || Spacewatch || — || align=right | 4.3 km || 
|-id=721 bgcolor=#d6d6d6
| 261721 ||  || — || January 5, 2006 || Kitt Peak || Spacewatch || — || align=right | 3.4 km || 
|-id=722 bgcolor=#d6d6d6
| 261722 ||  || — || January 5, 2006 || Kitt Peak || Spacewatch || — || align=right | 2.3 km || 
|-id=723 bgcolor=#d6d6d6
| 261723 ||  || — || January 7, 2006 || Mount Lemmon || Mount Lemmon Survey || — || align=right | 3.2 km || 
|-id=724 bgcolor=#d6d6d6
| 261724 ||  || — || January 5, 2006 || Anderson Mesa || LONEOS || — || align=right | 4.0 km || 
|-id=725 bgcolor=#d6d6d6
| 261725 ||  || — || January 5, 2006 || Kitt Peak || Spacewatch || — || align=right | 3.7 km || 
|-id=726 bgcolor=#d6d6d6
| 261726 ||  || — || January 7, 2006 || Socorro || LINEAR || URS || align=right | 4.6 km || 
|-id=727 bgcolor=#d6d6d6
| 261727 ||  || — || January 7, 2006 || Kitt Peak || Spacewatch || — || align=right | 3.7 km || 
|-id=728 bgcolor=#d6d6d6
| 261728 ||  || — || January 7, 2006 || Kitt Peak || Spacewatch || — || align=right | 4.4 km || 
|-id=729 bgcolor=#d6d6d6
| 261729 ||  || — || January 5, 2006 || Kitt Peak || Spacewatch || — || align=right | 3.9 km || 
|-id=730 bgcolor=#d6d6d6
| 261730 ||  || — || January 5, 2006 || Kitt Peak || Spacewatch || — || align=right | 2.6 km || 
|-id=731 bgcolor=#d6d6d6
| 261731 ||  || — || January 4, 2006 || Catalina || CSS || TIR || align=right | 3.6 km || 
|-id=732 bgcolor=#d6d6d6
| 261732 ||  || — || January 8, 2006 || Kitt Peak || Spacewatch || HYG || align=right | 3.2 km || 
|-id=733 bgcolor=#d6d6d6
| 261733 ||  || — || January 9, 2006 || Kitt Peak || Spacewatch || SAN || align=right | 1.8 km || 
|-id=734 bgcolor=#d6d6d6
| 261734 ||  || — || January 6, 2006 || Catalina || CSS || — || align=right | 4.9 km || 
|-id=735 bgcolor=#d6d6d6
| 261735 ||  || — || January 8, 2006 || Mount Lemmon || Mount Lemmon Survey || — || align=right | 4.7 km || 
|-id=736 bgcolor=#d6d6d6
| 261736 ||  || — || January 4, 2006 || Kitt Peak || Spacewatch || — || align=right | 5.1 km || 
|-id=737 bgcolor=#d6d6d6
| 261737 ||  || — || January 5, 2006 || Socorro || LINEAR || HYG || align=right | 3.9 km || 
|-id=738 bgcolor=#d6d6d6
| 261738 ||  || — || January 6, 2006 || Mount Lemmon || Mount Lemmon Survey || — || align=right | 3.4 km || 
|-id=739 bgcolor=#d6d6d6
| 261739 ||  || — || January 6, 2006 || Catalina || CSS || — || align=right | 4.9 km || 
|-id=740 bgcolor=#d6d6d6
| 261740 ||  || — || January 1, 2006 || Catalina || CSS || EUP || align=right | 6.8 km || 
|-id=741 bgcolor=#d6d6d6
| 261741 ||  || — || January 6, 2006 || Kitt Peak || Spacewatch || URS || align=right | 4.6 km || 
|-id=742 bgcolor=#d6d6d6
| 261742 ||  || — || January 7, 2006 || Mount Lemmon || Mount Lemmon Survey || — || align=right | 3.4 km || 
|-id=743 bgcolor=#d6d6d6
| 261743 ||  || — || January 4, 2006 || Catalina || CSS || — || align=right | 3.7 km || 
|-id=744 bgcolor=#d6d6d6
| 261744 ||  || — || January 7, 2006 || Mount Lemmon || Mount Lemmon Survey || THM || align=right | 3.0 km || 
|-id=745 bgcolor=#d6d6d6
| 261745 ||  || — || January 22, 2006 || Anderson Mesa || LONEOS || TIR || align=right | 3.9 km || 
|-id=746 bgcolor=#d6d6d6
| 261746 ||  || — || January 19, 2006 || Catalina || CSS || — || align=right | 4.9 km || 
|-id=747 bgcolor=#d6d6d6
| 261747 ||  || — || January 20, 2006 || Kitt Peak || Spacewatch || — || align=right | 3.3 km || 
|-id=748 bgcolor=#d6d6d6
| 261748 ||  || — || January 20, 2006 || Kitt Peak || Spacewatch || — || align=right | 4.6 km || 
|-id=749 bgcolor=#d6d6d6
| 261749 ||  || — || January 20, 2006 || Kitt Peak || Spacewatch || — || align=right | 2.9 km || 
|-id=750 bgcolor=#d6d6d6
| 261750 ||  || — || January 22, 2006 || Mount Lemmon || Mount Lemmon Survey || CHA || align=right | 2.7 km || 
|-id=751 bgcolor=#d6d6d6
| 261751 ||  || — || January 22, 2006 || Mount Lemmon || Mount Lemmon Survey || — || align=right | 4.1 km || 
|-id=752 bgcolor=#d6d6d6
| 261752 ||  || — || January 20, 2006 || Catalina || CSS || — || align=right | 4.3 km || 
|-id=753 bgcolor=#d6d6d6
| 261753 ||  || — || January 20, 2006 || Kitt Peak || Spacewatch || — || align=right | 3.7 km || 
|-id=754 bgcolor=#d6d6d6
| 261754 ||  || — || January 20, 2006 || Kitt Peak || Spacewatch || — || align=right | 3.4 km || 
|-id=755 bgcolor=#d6d6d6
| 261755 ||  || — || January 21, 2006 || Kitt Peak || Spacewatch || THM || align=right | 3.3 km || 
|-id=756 bgcolor=#fefefe
| 261756 ||  || — || January 21, 2006 || Kitt Peak || Spacewatch || FLO || align=right data-sort-value="0.75" | 750 m || 
|-id=757 bgcolor=#d6d6d6
| 261757 ||  || — || January 23, 2006 || Kitt Peak || Spacewatch || — || align=right | 4.1 km || 
|-id=758 bgcolor=#d6d6d6
| 261758 ||  || — || January 23, 2006 || Kitt Peak || Spacewatch || — || align=right | 4.9 km || 
|-id=759 bgcolor=#d6d6d6
| 261759 ||  || — || January 23, 2006 || Mount Lemmon || Mount Lemmon Survey || — || align=right | 3.7 km || 
|-id=760 bgcolor=#d6d6d6
| 261760 ||  || — || January 25, 2006 || Kitt Peak || Spacewatch || EOS || align=right | 2.8 km || 
|-id=761 bgcolor=#d6d6d6
| 261761 ||  || — || January 25, 2006 || Kitt Peak || Spacewatch || HYG || align=right | 4.6 km || 
|-id=762 bgcolor=#d6d6d6
| 261762 ||  || — || January 19, 2006 || Needville || J. Dellinger, W. G. Dillon || — || align=right | 4.9 km || 
|-id=763 bgcolor=#C2FFFF
| 261763 ||  || — || January 23, 2006 || Mount Lemmon || Mount Lemmon Survey || L5 || align=right | 12 km || 
|-id=764 bgcolor=#d6d6d6
| 261764 ||  || — || January 24, 2006 || Socorro || LINEAR || EOS || align=right | 3.4 km || 
|-id=765 bgcolor=#d6d6d6
| 261765 ||  || — || January 26, 2006 || Kitt Peak || Spacewatch || — || align=right | 3.2 km || 
|-id=766 bgcolor=#E9E9E9
| 261766 ||  || — || January 22, 2006 || Catalina || CSS || — || align=right | 3.4 km || 
|-id=767 bgcolor=#d6d6d6
| 261767 ||  || — || January 23, 2006 || Kitt Peak || Spacewatch || — || align=right | 4.4 km || 
|-id=768 bgcolor=#d6d6d6
| 261768 ||  || — || January 23, 2006 || Kitt Peak || Spacewatch || — || align=right | 2.9 km || 
|-id=769 bgcolor=#d6d6d6
| 261769 ||  || — || January 23, 2006 || Catalina || CSS || — || align=right | 4.4 km || 
|-id=770 bgcolor=#d6d6d6
| 261770 ||  || — || January 23, 2006 || Kitt Peak || Spacewatch || — || align=right | 3.8 km || 
|-id=771 bgcolor=#d6d6d6
| 261771 ||  || — || January 25, 2006 || Kitt Peak || Spacewatch || — || align=right | 3.2 km || 
|-id=772 bgcolor=#d6d6d6
| 261772 ||  || — || January 25, 2006 || Kitt Peak || Spacewatch || THM || align=right | 2.4 km || 
|-id=773 bgcolor=#d6d6d6
| 261773 ||  || — || January 25, 2006 || Kitt Peak || Spacewatch || EMA || align=right | 5.2 km || 
|-id=774 bgcolor=#C2FFFF
| 261774 ||  || — || January 26, 2006 || Kitt Peak || Spacewatch || L5 || align=right | 14 km || 
|-id=775 bgcolor=#d6d6d6
| 261775 ||  || — || January 27, 2006 || Mount Lemmon || Mount Lemmon Survey || — || align=right | 3.1 km || 
|-id=776 bgcolor=#d6d6d6
| 261776 ||  || — || January 25, 2006 || Kitt Peak || Spacewatch || — || align=right | 4.2 km || 
|-id=777 bgcolor=#d6d6d6
| 261777 ||  || — || January 25, 2006 || Kitt Peak || Spacewatch || — || align=right | 2.1 km || 
|-id=778 bgcolor=#d6d6d6
| 261778 ||  || — || January 25, 2006 || Kitt Peak || Spacewatch || — || align=right | 4.1 km || 
|-id=779 bgcolor=#d6d6d6
| 261779 ||  || — || January 26, 2006 || Mount Lemmon || Mount Lemmon Survey || LIX || align=right | 4.6 km || 
|-id=780 bgcolor=#d6d6d6
| 261780 ||  || — || January 26, 2006 || Kitt Peak || Spacewatch || THM || align=right | 2.6 km || 
|-id=781 bgcolor=#C2FFFF
| 261781 ||  || — || January 26, 2006 || Kitt Peak || Spacewatch || L5 || align=right | 12 km || 
|-id=782 bgcolor=#d6d6d6
| 261782 ||  || — || January 23, 2006 || Catalina || CSS || TIR || align=right | 4.2 km || 
|-id=783 bgcolor=#d6d6d6
| 261783 ||  || — || January 31, 2006 || 7300 Observatory || W. K. Y. Yeung || — || align=right | 6.6 km || 
|-id=784 bgcolor=#d6d6d6
| 261784 ||  || — || January 24, 2006 || Socorro || LINEAR || — || align=right | 3.5 km || 
|-id=785 bgcolor=#d6d6d6
| 261785 ||  || — || January 23, 2006 || Catalina || CSS || — || align=right | 4.4 km || 
|-id=786 bgcolor=#d6d6d6
| 261786 ||  || — || January 25, 2006 || Kitt Peak || Spacewatch || — || align=right | 2.8 km || 
|-id=787 bgcolor=#d6d6d6
| 261787 ||  || — || January 25, 2006 || Kitt Peak || Spacewatch || THM || align=right | 3.1 km || 
|-id=788 bgcolor=#d6d6d6
| 261788 ||  || — || January 25, 2006 || Kitt Peak || Spacewatch || EOS || align=right | 2.4 km || 
|-id=789 bgcolor=#C2FFFF
| 261789 ||  || — || January 26, 2006 || Kitt Peak || Spacewatch || L5 || align=right | 9.0 km || 
|-id=790 bgcolor=#d6d6d6
| 261790 ||  || — || January 26, 2006 || Catalina || CSS || — || align=right | 4.2 km || 
|-id=791 bgcolor=#C2FFFF
| 261791 ||  || — || January 26, 2006 || Kitt Peak || Spacewatch || L5 || align=right | 11 km || 
|-id=792 bgcolor=#d6d6d6
| 261792 ||  || — || January 27, 2006 || Mount Lemmon || Mount Lemmon Survey || — || align=right | 2.0 km || 
|-id=793 bgcolor=#d6d6d6
| 261793 ||  || — || January 27, 2006 || Mount Lemmon || Mount Lemmon Survey || — || align=right | 5.7 km || 
|-id=794 bgcolor=#d6d6d6
| 261794 ||  || — || January 9, 2006 || Kitt Peak || Spacewatch || — || align=right | 3.5 km || 
|-id=795 bgcolor=#d6d6d6
| 261795 ||  || — || January 28, 2006 || Kitt Peak || Spacewatch || — || align=right | 4.7 km || 
|-id=796 bgcolor=#d6d6d6
| 261796 ||  || — || January 31, 2006 || Mount Lemmon || Mount Lemmon Survey || CHA || align=right | 2.6 km || 
|-id=797 bgcolor=#d6d6d6
| 261797 ||  || — || January 31, 2006 || Catalina || CSS || — || align=right | 3.9 km || 
|-id=798 bgcolor=#d6d6d6
| 261798 ||  || — || January 26, 2006 || Catalina || CSS || VER || align=right | 4.0 km || 
|-id=799 bgcolor=#d6d6d6
| 261799 ||  || — || January 28, 2006 || Anderson Mesa || LONEOS || — || align=right | 3.7 km || 
|-id=800 bgcolor=#d6d6d6
| 261800 ||  || — || January 31, 2006 || Kitt Peak || Spacewatch || — || align=right | 3.5 km || 
|}

261801–261900 

|-bgcolor=#d6d6d6
| 261801 ||  || — || January 31, 2006 || Kitt Peak || Spacewatch || — || align=right | 2.6 km || 
|-id=802 bgcolor=#d6d6d6
| 261802 ||  || — || January 31, 2006 || Kitt Peak || Spacewatch || — || align=right | 4.1 km || 
|-id=803 bgcolor=#d6d6d6
| 261803 ||  || — || January 31, 2006 || Kitt Peak || Spacewatch || — || align=right | 3.6 km || 
|-id=804 bgcolor=#d6d6d6
| 261804 ||  || — || January 31, 2006 || Kitt Peak || Spacewatch || — || align=right | 3.1 km || 
|-id=805 bgcolor=#d6d6d6
| 261805 ||  || — || January 31, 2006 || Kitt Peak || Spacewatch || THM || align=right | 2.3 km || 
|-id=806 bgcolor=#d6d6d6
| 261806 ||  || — || January 31, 2006 || Kitt Peak || Spacewatch || 7:4* || align=right | 4.2 km || 
|-id=807 bgcolor=#E9E9E9
| 261807 ||  || — || January 26, 2006 || Catalina || CSS || GEF || align=right | 1.6 km || 
|-id=808 bgcolor=#d6d6d6
| 261808 ||  || — || January 30, 2006 || Catalina || CSS || — || align=right | 4.4 km || 
|-id=809 bgcolor=#d6d6d6
| 261809 ||  || — || January 23, 2006 || Kitt Peak || Spacewatch || — || align=right | 3.9 km || 
|-id=810 bgcolor=#d6d6d6
| 261810 ||  || — || January 23, 2006 || Kitt Peak || Spacewatch || — || align=right | 4.0 km || 
|-id=811 bgcolor=#d6d6d6
| 261811 ||  || — || January 23, 2006 || Kitt Peak || Spacewatch || THM || align=right | 2.8 km || 
|-id=812 bgcolor=#d6d6d6
| 261812 ||  || — || January 23, 2006 || Mount Lemmon || Mount Lemmon Survey || EOS || align=right | 3.6 km || 
|-id=813 bgcolor=#d6d6d6
| 261813 ||  || — || January 23, 2006 || Kitt Peak || Spacewatch || — || align=right | 4.0 km || 
|-id=814 bgcolor=#d6d6d6
| 261814 ||  || — || February 1, 2006 || Kitt Peak || Spacewatch || — || align=right | 3.4 km || 
|-id=815 bgcolor=#d6d6d6
| 261815 ||  || — || February 1, 2006 || Kitt Peak || Spacewatch || — || align=right | 4.0 km || 
|-id=816 bgcolor=#d6d6d6
| 261816 ||  || — || February 1, 2006 || Mount Lemmon || Mount Lemmon Survey || HYG || align=right | 3.3 km || 
|-id=817 bgcolor=#d6d6d6
| 261817 ||  || — || February 1, 2006 || Kitt Peak || Spacewatch || HYG || align=right | 4.5 km || 
|-id=818 bgcolor=#d6d6d6
| 261818 ||  || — || February 1, 2006 || Mount Lemmon || Mount Lemmon Survey || — || align=right | 4.3 km || 
|-id=819 bgcolor=#d6d6d6
| 261819 ||  || — || February 2, 2006 || Kitt Peak || Spacewatch || — || align=right | 4.3 km || 
|-id=820 bgcolor=#d6d6d6
| 261820 ||  || — || February 2, 2006 || Mount Lemmon || Mount Lemmon Survey || — || align=right | 3.5 km || 
|-id=821 bgcolor=#d6d6d6
| 261821 ||  || — || February 3, 2006 || Kitt Peak || Spacewatch || THM || align=right | 3.0 km || 
|-id=822 bgcolor=#d6d6d6
| 261822 ||  || — || February 3, 2006 || Kitt Peak || Spacewatch || — || align=right | 5.3 km || 
|-id=823 bgcolor=#d6d6d6
| 261823 ||  || — || February 3, 2006 || Kitt Peak || Spacewatch || THM || align=right | 3.1 km || 
|-id=824 bgcolor=#d6d6d6
| 261824 ||  || — || February 7, 2006 || Cordell-Lorenz || Cordell–Lorenz Obs. || — || align=right | 3.3 km || 
|-id=825 bgcolor=#d6d6d6
| 261825 ||  || — || February 7, 2006 || Kitt Peak || Spacewatch || THM || align=right | 2.7 km || 
|-id=826 bgcolor=#fefefe
| 261826 ||  || — || February 2, 2006 || Mount Lemmon || Mount Lemmon Survey || FLO || align=right data-sort-value="0.81" | 810 m || 
|-id=827 bgcolor=#d6d6d6
| 261827 ||  || — || February 20, 2006 || Kitt Peak || Spacewatch || 7:4* || align=right | 4.1 km || 
|-id=828 bgcolor=#d6d6d6
| 261828 ||  || — || February 20, 2006 || Mount Lemmon || Mount Lemmon Survey || — || align=right | 3.7 km || 
|-id=829 bgcolor=#d6d6d6
| 261829 ||  || — || February 21, 2006 || Catalina || CSS || — || align=right | 4.1 km || 
|-id=830 bgcolor=#d6d6d6
| 261830 ||  || — || February 22, 2006 || Catalina || CSS || — || align=right | 4.7 km || 
|-id=831 bgcolor=#fefefe
| 261831 ||  || — || February 20, 2006 || Mount Lemmon || Mount Lemmon Survey || — || align=right data-sort-value="0.81" | 810 m || 
|-id=832 bgcolor=#d6d6d6
| 261832 ||  || — || February 21, 2006 || Mount Lemmon || Mount Lemmon Survey || HYG || align=right | 3.7 km || 
|-id=833 bgcolor=#d6d6d6
| 261833 ||  || — || February 21, 2006 || Mount Lemmon || Mount Lemmon Survey || — || align=right | 5.1 km || 
|-id=834 bgcolor=#d6d6d6
| 261834 ||  || — || February 23, 2006 || Anderson Mesa || LONEOS || — || align=right | 4.0 km || 
|-id=835 bgcolor=#d6d6d6
| 261835 ||  || — || February 21, 2006 || Catalina || CSS || — || align=right | 4.5 km || 
|-id=836 bgcolor=#d6d6d6
| 261836 ||  || — || February 27, 2006 || Junk Bond || D. Healy || THM || align=right | 2.6 km || 
|-id=837 bgcolor=#d6d6d6
| 261837 ||  || — || February 20, 2006 || Catalina || CSS || THM || align=right | 3.2 km || 
|-id=838 bgcolor=#d6d6d6
| 261838 ||  || — || February 20, 2006 || Socorro || LINEAR || — || align=right | 5.3 km || 
|-id=839 bgcolor=#d6d6d6
| 261839 ||  || — || February 26, 2006 || Anderson Mesa || LONEOS || — || align=right | 5.9 km || 
|-id=840 bgcolor=#d6d6d6
| 261840 ||  || — || February 22, 2006 || Anderson Mesa || LONEOS || — || align=right | 3.6 km || 
|-id=841 bgcolor=#d6d6d6
| 261841 ||  || — || February 24, 2006 || Kitt Peak || Spacewatch || THM || align=right | 4.0 km || 
|-id=842 bgcolor=#fefefe
| 261842 ||  || — || February 24, 2006 || Kitt Peak || Spacewatch || — || align=right data-sort-value="0.89" | 890 m || 
|-id=843 bgcolor=#d6d6d6
| 261843 ||  || — || February 21, 2006 || Anderson Mesa || LONEOS || — || align=right | 4.3 km || 
|-id=844 bgcolor=#fefefe
| 261844 ||  || — || February 25, 2006 || Mount Lemmon || Mount Lemmon Survey || — || align=right data-sort-value="0.59" | 590 m || 
|-id=845 bgcolor=#d6d6d6
| 261845 ||  || — || February 25, 2006 || Kitt Peak || Spacewatch || — || align=right | 3.3 km || 
|-id=846 bgcolor=#d6d6d6
| 261846 ||  || — || February 25, 2006 || Kitt Peak || Spacewatch || EOS || align=right | 2.8 km || 
|-id=847 bgcolor=#fefefe
| 261847 ||  || — || February 27, 2006 || Kitt Peak || Spacewatch || — || align=right data-sort-value="0.69" | 690 m || 
|-id=848 bgcolor=#d6d6d6
| 261848 ||  || — || February 27, 2006 || Kitt Peak || Spacewatch || THM || align=right | 2.6 km || 
|-id=849 bgcolor=#d6d6d6
| 261849 ||  || — || February 27, 2006 || Kitt Peak || Spacewatch || SYL7:4 || align=right | 5.4 km || 
|-id=850 bgcolor=#fefefe
| 261850 ||  || — || February 27, 2006 || Mount Lemmon || Mount Lemmon Survey || — || align=right data-sort-value="0.76" | 760 m || 
|-id=851 bgcolor=#d6d6d6
| 261851 ||  || — || February 27, 2006 || Kitt Peak || Spacewatch || 7:4 || align=right | 4.0 km || 
|-id=852 bgcolor=#d6d6d6
| 261852 ||  || — || February 27, 2006 || Catalina || CSS || — || align=right | 4.4 km || 
|-id=853 bgcolor=#d6d6d6
| 261853 ||  || — || February 21, 2006 || Catalina || CSS || — || align=right | 5.3 km || 
|-id=854 bgcolor=#fefefe
| 261854 ||  || — || February 25, 2006 || Kitt Peak || Spacewatch || — || align=right data-sort-value="0.68" | 680 m || 
|-id=855 bgcolor=#fefefe
| 261855 ||  || — || February 24, 2006 || Mount Lemmon || Mount Lemmon Survey || — || align=right data-sort-value="0.78" | 780 m || 
|-id=856 bgcolor=#d6d6d6
| 261856 ||  || — || March 2, 2006 || Kitt Peak || Spacewatch || THM || align=right | 2.8 km || 
|-id=857 bgcolor=#d6d6d6
| 261857 ||  || — || March 3, 2006 || Mount Lemmon || Mount Lemmon Survey || — || align=right | 3.5 km || 
|-id=858 bgcolor=#d6d6d6
| 261858 ||  || — || March 4, 2006 || Catalina || CSS || EUP || align=right | 4.5 km || 
|-id=859 bgcolor=#d6d6d6
| 261859 ||  || — || March 4, 2006 || Catalina || CSS || — || align=right | 4.0 km || 
|-id=860 bgcolor=#d6d6d6
| 261860 ||  || — || March 5, 2006 || Kitt Peak || Spacewatch || — || align=right | 4.1 km || 
|-id=861 bgcolor=#d6d6d6
| 261861 ||  || — || March 5, 2006 || Kitt Peak || Spacewatch || — || align=right | 4.0 km || 
|-id=862 bgcolor=#fefefe
| 261862 ||  || — || March 23, 2006 || Kitt Peak || Spacewatch || NYS || align=right | 1.7 km || 
|-id=863 bgcolor=#d6d6d6
| 261863 ||  || — || March 23, 2006 || Catalina || CSS || — || align=right | 4.2 km || 
|-id=864 bgcolor=#fefefe
| 261864 ||  || — || March 23, 2006 || Kitt Peak || Spacewatch || FLO || align=right | 1.3 km || 
|-id=865 bgcolor=#d6d6d6
| 261865 ||  || — || March 26, 2006 || Reedy Creek || J. Broughton || — || align=right | 5.2 km || 
|-id=866 bgcolor=#fefefe
| 261866 ||  || — || March 23, 2006 || Kitt Peak || Spacewatch || — || align=right data-sort-value="0.70" | 700 m || 
|-id=867 bgcolor=#fefefe
| 261867 ||  || — || March 23, 2006 || Kitt Peak || Spacewatch || — || align=right data-sort-value="0.84" | 840 m || 
|-id=868 bgcolor=#fefefe
| 261868 ||  || — || March 23, 2006 || Kitt Peak || Spacewatch || — || align=right data-sort-value="0.68" | 680 m || 
|-id=869 bgcolor=#fefefe
| 261869 ||  || — || March 23, 2006 || Kitt Peak || Spacewatch || — || align=right | 2.2 km || 
|-id=870 bgcolor=#d6d6d6
| 261870 ||  || — || March 25, 2006 || Catalina || CSS || — || align=right | 6.4 km || 
|-id=871 bgcolor=#d6d6d6
| 261871 ||  || — || March 25, 2006 || Catalina || CSS || — || align=right | 7.0 km || 
|-id=872 bgcolor=#fefefe
| 261872 ||  || — || April 3, 2006 || Lulin Observatory || Q.-z. Ye || — || align=right | 1.2 km || 
|-id=873 bgcolor=#fefefe
| 261873 ||  || — || April 2, 2006 || Kitt Peak || Spacewatch || — || align=right data-sort-value="0.77" | 770 m || 
|-id=874 bgcolor=#fefefe
| 261874 ||  || — || April 2, 2006 || Mount Lemmon || Mount Lemmon Survey || — || align=right data-sort-value="0.82" | 820 m || 
|-id=875 bgcolor=#fefefe
| 261875 ||  || — || April 2, 2006 || Kitt Peak || Spacewatch || — || align=right data-sort-value="0.76" | 760 m || 
|-id=876 bgcolor=#fefefe
| 261876 ||  || — || April 6, 2006 || Catalina || CSS || H || align=right data-sort-value="0.79" | 790 m || 
|-id=877 bgcolor=#fefefe
| 261877 ||  || — || April 6, 2006 || Socorro || LINEAR || — || align=right | 1.6 km || 
|-id=878 bgcolor=#fefefe
| 261878 ||  || — || April 7, 2006 || Catalina || CSS || FLO || align=right data-sort-value="0.90" | 900 m || 
|-id=879 bgcolor=#FA8072
| 261879 ||  || — || April 10, 2006 || Siding Spring || SSS || — || align=right | 1.9 km || 
|-id=880 bgcolor=#d6d6d6
| 261880 ||  || — || April 18, 2006 || Kitt Peak || Spacewatch || 3:2 || align=right | 6.1 km || 
|-id=881 bgcolor=#fefefe
| 261881 ||  || — || April 19, 2006 || Mount Lemmon || Mount Lemmon Survey || H || align=right data-sort-value="0.82" | 820 m || 
|-id=882 bgcolor=#fefefe
| 261882 ||  || — || April 18, 2006 || Palomar || NEAT || — || align=right data-sort-value="0.99" | 990 m || 
|-id=883 bgcolor=#fefefe
| 261883 ||  || — || April 19, 2006 || Palomar || NEAT || H || align=right data-sort-value="0.57" | 570 m || 
|-id=884 bgcolor=#fefefe
| 261884 ||  || — || April 19, 2006 || Kitt Peak || Spacewatch || FLO || align=right data-sort-value="0.58" | 580 m || 
|-id=885 bgcolor=#fefefe
| 261885 ||  || — || April 19, 2006 || Kitt Peak || Spacewatch || FLO || align=right data-sort-value="0.62" | 620 m || 
|-id=886 bgcolor=#d6d6d6
| 261886 ||  || — || April 20, 2006 || Mount Lemmon || Mount Lemmon Survey || — || align=right | 3.0 km || 
|-id=887 bgcolor=#fefefe
| 261887 ||  || — || April 18, 2006 || Kitt Peak || Spacewatch || NYS || align=right data-sort-value="0.74" | 740 m || 
|-id=888 bgcolor=#fefefe
| 261888 ||  || — || April 19, 2006 || Mount Lemmon || Mount Lemmon Survey || — || align=right | 1.1 km || 
|-id=889 bgcolor=#d6d6d6
| 261889 ||  || — || April 20, 2006 || Kitt Peak || Spacewatch || — || align=right | 3.4 km || 
|-id=890 bgcolor=#fefefe
| 261890 ||  || — || April 20, 2006 || Catalina || CSS || NYS || align=right data-sort-value="0.71" | 710 m || 
|-id=891 bgcolor=#fefefe
| 261891 ||  || — || April 24, 2006 || Socorro || LINEAR || — || align=right | 1.4 km || 
|-id=892 bgcolor=#fefefe
| 261892 ||  || — || April 24, 2006 || Mount Lemmon || Mount Lemmon Survey || — || align=right data-sort-value="0.72" | 720 m || 
|-id=893 bgcolor=#fefefe
| 261893 ||  || — || April 25, 2006 || Catalina || CSS || — || align=right | 1.0 km || 
|-id=894 bgcolor=#d6d6d6
| 261894 ||  || — || April 24, 2006 || Reedy Creek || J. Broughton || — || align=right | 4.6 km || 
|-id=895 bgcolor=#fefefe
| 261895 ||  || — || April 24, 2006 || Reedy Creek || J. Broughton || — || align=right | 1.2 km || 
|-id=896 bgcolor=#d6d6d6
| 261896 ||  || — || April 26, 2006 || Reedy Creek || J. Broughton || — || align=right | 5.4 km || 
|-id=897 bgcolor=#fefefe
| 261897 ||  || — || April 19, 2006 || Catalina || CSS || — || align=right | 1.0 km || 
|-id=898 bgcolor=#fefefe
| 261898 ||  || — || April 24, 2006 || Anderson Mesa || LONEOS || — || align=right | 1.7 km || 
|-id=899 bgcolor=#fefefe
| 261899 ||  || — || April 25, 2006 || Kitt Peak || Spacewatch || V || align=right data-sort-value="0.78" | 780 m || 
|-id=900 bgcolor=#fefefe
| 261900 ||  || — || April 26, 2006 || Kitt Peak || Spacewatch || — || align=right data-sort-value="0.60" | 600 m || 
|}

261901–262000 

|-bgcolor=#fefefe
| 261901 ||  || — || April 26, 2006 || Kitt Peak || Spacewatch || — || align=right data-sort-value="0.84" | 840 m || 
|-id=902 bgcolor=#fefefe
| 261902 ||  || — || April 29, 2006 || Kitt Peak || Spacewatch || — || align=right data-sort-value="0.96" | 960 m || 
|-id=903 bgcolor=#fefefe
| 261903 ||  || — || April 19, 2006 || Catalina || CSS || FLO || align=right data-sort-value="0.88" | 880 m || 
|-id=904 bgcolor=#fefefe
| 261904 ||  || — || April 24, 2006 || Mount Lemmon || Mount Lemmon Survey || MAS || align=right data-sort-value="0.72" | 720 m || 
|-id=905 bgcolor=#E9E9E9
| 261905 ||  || — || May 2, 2006 || Kitt Peak || Spacewatch || WIT || align=right | 1.4 km || 
|-id=906 bgcolor=#fefefe
| 261906 ||  || — || May 3, 2006 || Kitt Peak || Spacewatch || — || align=right data-sort-value="0.79" | 790 m || 
|-id=907 bgcolor=#fefefe
| 261907 ||  || — || May 6, 2006 || Kitt Peak || Spacewatch || FLO || align=right data-sort-value="0.65" | 650 m || 
|-id=908 bgcolor=#fefefe
| 261908 ||  || — || May 5, 2006 || Kitt Peak || Spacewatch || V || align=right data-sort-value="0.90" | 900 m || 
|-id=909 bgcolor=#fefefe
| 261909 ||  || — || May 2, 2006 || Mount Lemmon || Mount Lemmon Survey || — || align=right | 1.0 km || 
|-id=910 bgcolor=#d6d6d6
| 261910 ||  || — || May 8, 2006 || Siding Spring || SSS || — || align=right | 5.5 km || 
|-id=911 bgcolor=#fefefe
| 261911 ||  || — || May 8, 2006 || Mount Lemmon || Mount Lemmon Survey || NYS || align=right data-sort-value="0.55" | 550 m || 
|-id=912 bgcolor=#fefefe
| 261912 ||  || — || May 18, 2006 || Palomar || NEAT || — || align=right data-sort-value="0.78" | 780 m || 
|-id=913 bgcolor=#fefefe
| 261913 ||  || — || May 19, 2006 || Mount Lemmon || Mount Lemmon Survey || NYS || align=right data-sort-value="0.78" | 780 m || 
|-id=914 bgcolor=#fefefe
| 261914 ||  || — || May 19, 2006 || Mount Lemmon || Mount Lemmon Survey || ERI || align=right | 2.2 km || 
|-id=915 bgcolor=#fefefe
| 261915 ||  || — || May 20, 2006 || Mount Lemmon || Mount Lemmon Survey || — || align=right data-sort-value="0.64" | 640 m || 
|-id=916 bgcolor=#fefefe
| 261916 ||  || — || May 20, 2006 || Catalina || CSS || — || align=right | 1.6 km || 
|-id=917 bgcolor=#fefefe
| 261917 ||  || — || May 23, 2006 || Reedy Creek || J. Broughton || — || align=right | 1.1 km || 
|-id=918 bgcolor=#FA8072
| 261918 ||  || — || May 23, 2006 || Reedy Creek || J. Broughton || — || align=right data-sort-value="0.81" | 810 m || 
|-id=919 bgcolor=#d6d6d6
| 261919 ||  || — || May 20, 2006 || Kitt Peak || Spacewatch || 3:2 || align=right | 5.9 km || 
|-id=920 bgcolor=#fefefe
| 261920 ||  || — || May 21, 2006 || Mount Lemmon || Mount Lemmon Survey || FLO || align=right | 1.0 km || 
|-id=921 bgcolor=#fefefe
| 261921 ||  || — || May 21, 2006 || Kitt Peak || Spacewatch || — || align=right data-sort-value="0.77" | 770 m || 
|-id=922 bgcolor=#fefefe
| 261922 ||  || — || May 22, 2006 || Kitt Peak || Spacewatch || FLO || align=right data-sort-value="0.64" | 640 m || 
|-id=923 bgcolor=#fefefe
| 261923 ||  || — || May 24, 2006 || Mount Lemmon || Mount Lemmon Survey || V || align=right data-sort-value="0.98" | 980 m || 
|-id=924 bgcolor=#fefefe
| 261924 ||  || — || May 27, 2006 || Catalina || CSS || FLO || align=right data-sort-value="0.85" | 850 m || 
|-id=925 bgcolor=#fefefe
| 261925 ||  || — || May 24, 2006 || Palomar || NEAT || — || align=right | 1.2 km || 
|-id=926 bgcolor=#fefefe
| 261926 ||  || — || May 29, 2006 || Reedy Creek || J. Broughton || NYS || align=right | 1.7 km || 
|-id=927 bgcolor=#fefefe
| 261927 ||  || — || May 31, 2006 || Mount Lemmon || Mount Lemmon Survey || — || align=right data-sort-value="0.91" | 910 m || 
|-id=928 bgcolor=#fefefe
| 261928 ||  || — || May 29, 2006 || Kitt Peak || Spacewatch || — || align=right | 1.1 km || 
|-id=929 bgcolor=#fefefe
| 261929 ||  || — || May 31, 2006 || Mount Lemmon || Mount Lemmon Survey || — || align=right data-sort-value="0.94" | 940 m || 
|-id=930 bgcolor=#fefefe
| 261930 Moorhead ||  ||  || May 25, 2006 || Mauna Kea || P. A. Wiegert || — || align=right data-sort-value="0.91" | 910 m || 
|-id=931 bgcolor=#fefefe
| 261931 ||  || — || June 17, 2006 || Kitt Peak || Spacewatch || — || align=right data-sort-value="0.99" | 990 m || 
|-id=932 bgcolor=#fefefe
| 261932 ||  || — || June 19, 2006 || Wrightwood || J. W. Young || NYS || align=right data-sort-value="0.67" | 670 m || 
|-id=933 bgcolor=#fefefe
| 261933 ||  || — || June 16, 2006 || Palomar || NEAT || — || align=right data-sort-value="0.87" | 870 m || 
|-id=934 bgcolor=#FA8072
| 261934 ||  || — || June 18, 2006 || Kitt Peak || Spacewatch || — || align=right | 1.1 km || 
|-id=935 bgcolor=#fefefe
| 261935 ||  || — || July 18, 2006 || Lulin Observatory || LUSS || NYS || align=right data-sort-value="0.67" | 670 m || 
|-id=936 bgcolor=#E9E9E9
| 261936 Liulin ||  ||  || July 19, 2006 || Lulin Observatory || Q.-z. Ye, H.-C. Lin || — || align=right | 1.2 km || 
|-id=937 bgcolor=#fefefe
| 261937 ||  || — || July 21, 2006 || Mount Lemmon || Mount Lemmon Survey || — || align=right | 1.1 km || 
|-id=938 bgcolor=#FFC2E0
| 261938 ||  || — || July 21, 2006 || Socorro || LINEAR || AMO || align=right data-sort-value="0.33" | 330 m || 
|-id=939 bgcolor=#fefefe
| 261939 ||  || — || July 18, 2006 || Lulin || LUSS || — || align=right | 2.0 km || 
|-id=940 bgcolor=#fefefe
| 261940 ||  || — || July 20, 2006 || Palomar || NEAT || — || align=right | 1.0 km || 
|-id=941 bgcolor=#fefefe
| 261941 ||  || — || July 21, 2006 || Catalina || CSS || — || align=right | 1.1 km || 
|-id=942 bgcolor=#fefefe
| 261942 ||  || — || July 20, 2006 || Palomar || NEAT || FLO || align=right data-sort-value="0.72" | 720 m || 
|-id=943 bgcolor=#fefefe
| 261943 ||  || — || July 20, 2006 || Palomar || NEAT || V || align=right data-sort-value="0.88" | 880 m || 
|-id=944 bgcolor=#fefefe
| 261944 ||  || — || July 25, 2006 || Palomar || NEAT || NYS || align=right data-sort-value="0.73" | 730 m || 
|-id=945 bgcolor=#fefefe
| 261945 ||  || — || July 26, 2006 || Reedy Creek || J. Broughton || — || align=right | 1.5 km || 
|-id=946 bgcolor=#E9E9E9
| 261946 ||  || — || July 20, 2006 || Siding Spring || SSS || — || align=right | 1.3 km || 
|-id=947 bgcolor=#fefefe
| 261947 ||  || — || July 25, 2006 || Mount Lemmon || Mount Lemmon Survey || — || align=right data-sort-value="0.89" | 890 m || 
|-id=948 bgcolor=#fefefe
| 261948 ||  || — || August 11, 2006 || Palomar || NEAT || — || align=right data-sort-value="0.99" | 990 m || 
|-id=949 bgcolor=#fefefe
| 261949 ||  || — || August 12, 2006 || Palomar || NEAT || NYS || align=right data-sort-value="0.79" | 790 m || 
|-id=950 bgcolor=#fefefe
| 261950 ||  || — || August 11, 2006 || Palomar || NEAT || V || align=right data-sort-value="0.95" | 950 m || 
|-id=951 bgcolor=#fefefe
| 261951 ||  || — || August 12, 2006 || Palomar || NEAT || NYScritical || align=right | 1.4 km || 
|-id=952 bgcolor=#fefefe
| 261952 ||  || — || August 12, 2006 || Palomar || NEAT || NYS || align=right data-sort-value="0.77" | 770 m || 
|-id=953 bgcolor=#fefefe
| 261953 ||  || — || August 13, 2006 || Palomar || NEAT || — || align=right | 1.1 km || 
|-id=954 bgcolor=#E9E9E9
| 261954 ||  || — || August 13, 2006 || Palomar || NEAT || — || align=right | 1.9 km || 
|-id=955 bgcolor=#fefefe
| 261955 ||  || — || August 13, 2006 || Palomar || NEAT || — || align=right | 1.1 km || 
|-id=956 bgcolor=#fefefe
| 261956 ||  || — || August 13, 2006 || Palomar || NEAT || — || align=right data-sort-value="0.99" | 990 m || 
|-id=957 bgcolor=#fefefe
| 261957 ||  || — || August 15, 2006 || Palomar || NEAT || — || align=right data-sort-value="0.86" | 860 m || 
|-id=958 bgcolor=#fefefe
| 261958 ||  || — || August 15, 2006 || Palomar || NEAT || NYS || align=right data-sort-value="0.73" | 730 m || 
|-id=959 bgcolor=#fefefe
| 261959 ||  || — || August 15, 2006 || Palomar || NEAT || — || align=right data-sort-value="0.96" | 960 m || 
|-id=960 bgcolor=#fefefe
| 261960 ||  || — || August 15, 2006 || Palomar || NEAT || ERI || align=right | 2.0 km || 
|-id=961 bgcolor=#fefefe
| 261961 ||  || — || August 13, 2006 || Palomar || NEAT || — || align=right data-sort-value="0.71" | 710 m || 
|-id=962 bgcolor=#fefefe
| 261962 ||  || — || August 15, 2006 || Palomar || NEAT || — || align=right data-sort-value="0.81" | 810 m || 
|-id=963 bgcolor=#fefefe
| 261963 ||  || — || August 13, 2006 || Palomar || NEAT || — || align=right data-sort-value="0.90" | 900 m || 
|-id=964 bgcolor=#fefefe
| 261964 ||  || — || August 13, 2006 || Palomar || NEAT || — || align=right | 1.2 km || 
|-id=965 bgcolor=#fefefe
| 261965 ||  || — || August 15, 2006 || Palomar || NEAT || — || align=right data-sort-value="0.83" | 830 m || 
|-id=966 bgcolor=#fefefe
| 261966 ||  || — || August 12, 2006 || Palomar || NEAT || — || align=right data-sort-value="0.97" | 970 m || 
|-id=967 bgcolor=#fefefe
| 261967 ||  || — || August 13, 2006 || Palomar || NEAT || — || align=right data-sort-value="0.89" | 890 m || 
|-id=968 bgcolor=#fefefe
| 261968 ||  || — || August 15, 2006 || Palomar || NEAT || NYS || align=right data-sort-value="0.74" | 740 m || 
|-id=969 bgcolor=#fefefe
| 261969 ||  || — || August 14, 2006 || Siding Spring || SSS || V || align=right data-sort-value="0.86" | 860 m || 
|-id=970 bgcolor=#fefefe
| 261970 ||  || — || August 12, 2006 || Palomar || NEAT || — || align=right | 1.2 km || 
|-id=971 bgcolor=#fefefe
| 261971 ||  || — || August 12, 2006 || Palomar || NEAT || NYS || align=right data-sort-value="0.82" | 820 m || 
|-id=972 bgcolor=#fefefe
| 261972 ||  || — || August 14, 2006 || Palomar || NEAT || V || align=right data-sort-value="0.65" | 650 m || 
|-id=973 bgcolor=#fefefe
| 261973 ||  || — || August 17, 2006 || Palomar || NEAT || NYS || align=right data-sort-value="0.85" | 850 m || 
|-id=974 bgcolor=#fefefe
| 261974 ||  || — || August 18, 2006 || Kitt Peak || Spacewatch || NYS || align=right data-sort-value="0.88" | 880 m || 
|-id=975 bgcolor=#fefefe
| 261975 ||  || — || August 19, 2006 || Kitt Peak || Spacewatch || — || align=right | 1.1 km || 
|-id=976 bgcolor=#fefefe
| 261976 ||  || — || August 19, 2006 || Reedy Creek || J. Broughton || — || align=right | 1.4 km || 
|-id=977 bgcolor=#fefefe
| 261977 ||  || — || August 20, 2006 || Pla D'Arguines || R. Ferrando || V || align=right data-sort-value="0.83" | 830 m || 
|-id=978 bgcolor=#fefefe
| 261978 ||  || — || August 16, 2006 || Siding Spring || SSS || V || align=right | 1.1 km || 
|-id=979 bgcolor=#fefefe
| 261979 ||  || — || August 17, 2006 || Palomar || NEAT || — || align=right | 1.1 km || 
|-id=980 bgcolor=#fefefe
| 261980 ||  || — || August 17, 2006 || Palomar || NEAT || — || align=right data-sort-value="0.98" | 980 m || 
|-id=981 bgcolor=#fefefe
| 261981 ||  || — || August 18, 2006 || Anderson Mesa || LONEOS || — || align=right data-sort-value="0.93" | 930 m || 
|-id=982 bgcolor=#fefefe
| 261982 ||  || — || August 19, 2006 || Kitt Peak || Spacewatch || NYS || align=right data-sort-value="0.66" | 660 m || 
|-id=983 bgcolor=#E9E9E9
| 261983 ||  || — || August 19, 2006 || Anderson Mesa || LONEOS || — || align=right | 2.0 km || 
|-id=984 bgcolor=#fefefe
| 261984 ||  || — || August 22, 2006 || Wrightwood || J. W. Young || V || align=right data-sort-value="0.82" | 820 m || 
|-id=985 bgcolor=#fefefe
| 261985 ||  || — || August 17, 2006 || Palomar || NEAT || NYS || align=right data-sort-value="0.90" | 900 m || 
|-id=986 bgcolor=#fefefe
| 261986 ||  || — || August 18, 2006 || Kitt Peak || Spacewatch || ERI || align=right | 1.7 km || 
|-id=987 bgcolor=#fefefe
| 261987 ||  || — || August 17, 2006 || Palomar || NEAT || — || align=right | 1.3 km || 
|-id=988 bgcolor=#fefefe
| 261988 ||  || — || August 18, 2006 || Socorro || LINEAR || — || align=right data-sort-value="0.95" | 950 m || 
|-id=989 bgcolor=#fefefe
| 261989 ||  || — || August 23, 2006 || Hibiscus || S. F. Hönig || FLO || align=right data-sort-value="0.90" | 900 m || 
|-id=990 bgcolor=#fefefe
| 261990 ||  || — || August 17, 2006 || Palomar || NEAT || — || align=right | 1.00 km || 
|-id=991 bgcolor=#fefefe
| 261991 ||  || — || August 17, 2006 || Palomar || NEAT || FLO || align=right | 1.0 km || 
|-id=992 bgcolor=#fefefe
| 261992 ||  || — || August 18, 2006 || Socorro || LINEAR || FLO || align=right | 1.0 km || 
|-id=993 bgcolor=#fefefe
| 261993 ||  || — || August 18, 2006 || Anderson Mesa || LONEOS || V || align=right data-sort-value="0.82" | 820 m || 
|-id=994 bgcolor=#fefefe
| 261994 ||  || — || August 19, 2006 || Anderson Mesa || LONEOS || — || align=right data-sort-value="0.98" | 980 m || 
|-id=995 bgcolor=#fefefe
| 261995 ||  || — || August 16, 2006 || Siding Spring || SSS || NYS || align=right data-sort-value="0.75" | 750 m || 
|-id=996 bgcolor=#fefefe
| 261996 ||  || — || August 17, 2006 || Palomar || NEAT || NYS || align=right data-sort-value="0.92" | 920 m || 
|-id=997 bgcolor=#fefefe
| 261997 ||  || — || August 19, 2006 || Palomar || NEAT || V || align=right data-sort-value="0.79" | 790 m || 
|-id=998 bgcolor=#fefefe
| 261998 ||  || — || August 20, 2006 || Palomar || NEAT || NYS || align=right | 1.0 km || 
|-id=999 bgcolor=#fefefe
| 261999 ||  || — || August 21, 2006 || Palomar || NEAT || — || align=right data-sort-value="0.94" | 940 m || 
|-id=000 bgcolor=#fefefe
| 262000 ||  || — || August 22, 2006 || Palomar || NEAT || NYS || align=right | 1.0 km || 
|}

References

External links 
 Discovery Circumstances: Numbered Minor Planets (260001)–(265000) (IAU Minor Planet Center)

0261